The National University of San Marcos  (UNMSM) is a public research university located in Lima, the capital of Peru. It is considered the most important, recognized and representative educational institution at the national level. At the continental level, it is the first officially established (privilege by Charles V, Holy Roman Emperor) and the oldest continuously operating university in the Americas, which is why it appears in official documents and publications as "University of Peru, Dean University of the Americas". It had its beginnings in the general studies that were offered in the cloisters of the convent of the Rosario of the order of Santo Domingo —current Basilica and Convent of Santo Domingo— around 1548. Its official foundation was conceived by Fray Thomas de San Martín on May 12, 1551; with the decree of Emperor Carlos I of Spain and V of the Holy Roman Empire, in 1571, it acquired the degree of pontifical granted by Pope Pius V with which it ended up being named as the "Royal and Pontifical University of the City of the Kings of Lima". Being recognized by the Spanish Crown as the first university in America officially founded by Real cédula, it is also referred to as the "University of Lima" throughout the Viceroyalty. Throughout its history, the university had a total of four colleges under tutelage: the Colegio Real y Mayor de San Martín and the Colegio Real y Mayor de San Felipe y San Marcos, the Real Colegio de San Carlos —focused on law and letters, derived from the merger of the two previous ones—and the Royal College of San Fernando—focused on medicine and surgery—. In the times of emancipation, it acquired a main role in the formation of several of the leaders managing the independence of Peru. After the proclamation of independence and during the republic, it maintains both colloquially and formally —in various treaties and documents historical—its name as "University of Lima" until 1946, the year in which its current name and denomination as National and Major University were made official.

The University of San Marcos is considered the most important and representative Peruvian institution of higher education for its "tradition, prestige, quality and selectivity", being also recognized as the institution with the highest scientific production in Peru. 

It has positioned itself in the 1st place at the national level in certain editions of various university rankings, such as in the first University Ranking of Peru prepared by the National Assembly of Rectors of Peru under the auspices of UNESCO in 2006, in the University Rankings by Academic Performance of the URAP Center, in various editions of the QS World University Rankings by Quacquarelli Simonds, in the Web Rankings of Universities prepared by CSIC and known as Webometrics, in the University Web Rankings by 4ICU, in the University Web Rankings by 4ICU, and in the SIR World Reports by SCImago Research Center; being together with the UPCH (created by professors from the Faculty of Medicine of San Marcos) and the PUCP (whose founder and benefactor was a San Marcos graduate), one of the only three Peruvian universities that have appeared in such a position, as well as the only public one to do so. In addition, it has a ten-year institutional license granted by the National Superintendence of Higher University Education (SUNEDU) and some international institutional accreditations that certify its academic and administrative quality. In terms of research, according to information from the Scopus database, the University of San Marcos is to date the 1st Peruvian institution in the production of scientific articles, both annually and historically. Various influential Peruvians and Latin Americans have come out of its classrooms, all recognizing and valuing the high level of teaching and the active and important intellectual participation that the university and its students had throughout the history of Peru. The University of San Marcos has been referred to many times as a reflection of Peru for expressing the advances and limitations that the country eventually has, in addition to the valued diversity, preparation and activism of its students. Twenty-one Presidents of the Republic of Peru, five Peruvian candidates for Nobel Prizes of Physics, Literature and Peace —of the total of six Peruvians nominated between 1901 and 1964, the only period currently published by the Norwegian Committee— and a Nobel Prize winner —Mario Vargas Llosa, until now the only Peruvian with such recognition— they have been graduates, researchers and/or professors of this university.

In its 471 years of operation, the University of San Marcos has passed through several locations, of which it maintains and stands out: the "Casona de San Marcos", a historic location of the university with more than 400 years of history —part of the area and of the list of buildings in the Historic Center of Lima that were recognized as a World Heritage Site by UNESCO in 1988—and that are currently the venue for the main cultural activities and the granting of high degrees by the university; the current premises of the "San Fernando" Faculty of Medicine, inaugurated in 1901 for the first medical school in the country; and the so-called "University City", which has been its main headquarters since 1960, where most of the faculties, the central library, the university stadium and the rectory are located, and most of the academic and research activities are carried out. All these premises are located in the Cercado de Lima. The University of San Marcos currently has 66 professional schools, grouped into 20 faculties, and these in turn in 5 academic areas, being the Peruvian university that covers the largest number of university subjects. All faculties offer both undergraduate and postgraduate programs. It also has various centers, institutions, and dependencies; such as its cultural centers, museums, libraries, clinics, and university clinics, editorial fund, among others. In addition, through its "Domingo Angulo" historical archive, the university preserves documents and writings of great historical relevance dating from the 16th, 17th, 18th, and 19th centuries. In 2019, the "Colonial Fund and Foundational Documents of the National University of San Marcos: 1551–1852” was incorporated into the UNESCO Memory of the World Register, in recognition of its significance for the global collective memory.

History 

The origin of the National University of San Marcos is also the origin of higher education in Peru and the Americas, which dates back to the General Studies carried out in the cloisters of the Convent of the Rosario of the Order of Santo Domingo—current Basilica and Convento de Santo Domingo—, near the Plaza de Armas in Lima around 1548, whose main objective was to satisfy the needs of the training and education of the clergy in the new territory conquered by the Spanish Empire. Subsequently, the Lima town council would send Fray Tomás de San Martín and Captain Juan Jerónimo de Aliaga to Spain, who —largely thanks to the efforts of the former— obtained the founding order of the university from Emperor Carlos I of Spain. and V of the Holy Roman Empire and Queen Juana I of Castile, daughter of the Catholic Monarchs, through the Royal Provision issued on May 12, 1551, in Valladolid. In this way, the foundation of the Royal University of the City of Kings, also referred to as the Royal University of Lima, was officially carried out. The reading also of the Royal Certificate, which officially authorizes the operation of the "University of Lima", indicates as a mission: "indoctrinate the residents of these lands in the Christian faith and submission to the King." With this principle, the university began to function officially on January 2, 1553, in the Chapter House of the Convent of Our Lady of the Rosary of the Order of Santo Domingo, under the direction of its first rector Fray Juan Bautista de la Roca; the initial chair was taught by Andrés Cianca and Corona Cosme Carrillo, under the supervision of the rector.

The orientation, in principle strictly monastic, as well as the exclusivism and conservation of the Dominicans, and the continuous decrease in members of other congregations, gave rise to the Dominicans losing predominance and also generated a reaction on the part of lay teachers; the demand for greater openness led them to ask the Royal Court for compliance with the Royal decree of 1570, which provided for a free election of the rector by the teachers of the cloister. The claim fell on Viceroy Francisco Álvarez de Toledo who favored and ended the claim with the election of Pedro Fernández de Valenzuela on May 11, 1571, the first lay rector, and the significant change in the orientation of the university. The official status of the university is reaffirmed by the papal bull Exponi Nobis of Saint Pius V of July 25, 1571, after receiving the Royal Pass from the Council of the Indies; in it he avoided the ecclesiastical courts by declaring that "it absolves friars, readers, teachers, students and any of you from any and all censures, sentences and ecclesiastical penalties, for any reason and cause contracted", likewise the university acquires with this bull its pontifical degree, which is why it is renamed the Royal and Pontifical University of the City of the Kings of Lima. Produced this first reform, the university moved to its second location, near the outskirts of San Marcelo, where the Convent of the Order of Saint Augustine had previously operated. On September 6, 1574, the official name of the university was chosen by lot —among the names of the four evangelists—, finally resulting in the official name of Royal and Pontifical University of San Marcos (Saint Mark), and therefore Mark the Evangelist as the patron saint of the University. In 1575, the university changes its establishment again and is located in the old Plaza del Estanque, later called Plaza de la Inquisición, where the building of the Congress of Peru is currently located, place where it would continue its operation throughout the time of the Viceroyalty of Peru.

The officially named University of San Marcos, then also known as the "University of Lima", began its work in the viceregal era with the faculties of Theology and Arts, later the canons of Law and Medicine would be created, however in the academic field the norms that governed in Spain were adopted, that is to say, it began its functions with the teaching of Philosophy as the basis for any other higher study. On July 7, 1579, the «Chair of the General Language of the Indians» was established for the study of the most widespread family of Andean languages among the natives during the Inca Empire and the Viceroyalty of Peru: Quechua; its first professor was Juan de Balboa. On November 27, 1579, the professors asked King Philip II for the institution of jurisdiction that governed the University of Salamanca, a medieval legal figure —an antecedent of the current university autonomy— that empowered the rector so that, with the exclusion of the ordinary courts, had civil and criminal jurisdiction over the members of the faculty. In 1581, and after the absolute presence of lay rectors between 1571 and 1581, Viceroy Francisco Álvarez de Toledo authorized clerics and laymen could be elected; Thus, both sectors alternately governed the University of San Marcos, during the colonial period, until 1820.

The support for the secularization of the University of San Marcos given by Viceroy Francisco Álvarez de Toledo and for the institution of the jurisdiction exercised by its rector, and also exercised by the rector of the Royal Convictory of San Carlos, founded on July 7, 1770, They were the decisive factors that led the university community, students and professors, towards the realization of the Bolognese ideal that conceived the university as a space of freedom. In this way, the intellectual climate that made it possible to question and criticize the colonial system began to emerge. Between 1792 and 1811, the anatomical amphitheater and medicine chairs began to develop in the historic location of the Royal Hospital of San Andrés. At that time, both the University of San Marcos and the College of Law and Letters of San Carlos and the College of Medicine of San Fernando — later incorporated into it — began to be carefully watched by the Viceroy, due to the fact that they house professors and students suspected of envisioning and managing the end of the colonial regime and the emergence of what is today the Peruvian Republic. Presumably it was the privileges enjoyed by both the university and the convictory, which allowed the entry of Enlightenment thought into its cloisters, thus the theoretical and ideological doctrinal approaches of emancipation arose within it. In 1813, during the administration of Viceroy José Fernando de Abascal, the “San Fernando” Faculty of Medicine's name was established in homage to King Ferdinand VII of Spain, in Plaza de Santa Ana —today Plaza Italia— in the premises occupied by the Ministry of Government, the faculty was formed based on the College of Medicine of the same name that was located in the Plaza del Estanque. Throughout its history, the university had a total of four colleges under its tutelage: the Colegio Real y Mayor de San Martín and the Colegio Real y Mayor de San Felipe y San Marcos, the Real Colegio de San Carlos —focused on law and letters, derived from the merger of the two previous ones—and the Royal College of San Fernando—focused on medicine and surgery—.

In the times of emancipation, the university acquires a main role in the formation of several of the main managing leaders of the independence of Peru. From the legal point of view in relation to property, the University of San Marcos, which belonged to the monarchical State, became part of the young Republic of Peru since its independence in 1821. The First Constituent Congress of Peru, which defined the new Peruvian Republic as a reality and as a project, was initially chaired by the former rector of the University of San Marcos, Toribio Rodríguez de Mendoza; Of the 64 constituent deputies, 54 were San Marcos' alumnus and Carolines'; and the place where this great assembly met was the Chapel of the University of San Marcos. Today, the Congress of the Republic of Peru continues to function in that same location. In 1822 the university hands over its collection of 50,000 books to form the newly founded National Library of Peru. In 1840, the Colleges of San Carlos and San Fernando are taken over by the University of San Marcos. During the government of Ramón Castilla, San Marcos was officially empowered by the president to approve new universities and control the newly created ones. Throughout the 19th century, the premises of the University of San Marcos abandoned its academic functions, becoming more regular as a space for meetings of the Chamber of Deputies and the Congress of the Republic. The absence of care and the partial abandonment of their university functions led to a gradual deterioration of their environments. It is in this context of the end of the 19th century that the university completely donates its premises to the then still young Congress of the Republic of Peru.

The exponential growth of the city during the industrial revolution of the 19th century, in addition to the efforts of the then President of Peru Manuel Pardo to improve the city's architecture and urban planning during the 1870s, forced the university to move to a new campus adjacent to the former Jesuit monastery where the Royal Convictory of San Carlos resided —currently, this is called the "Casona of the University Park" or simply the "Casona of San Marcos"—. In those years, San Marcos was already considered the tutelary nucleus of scientific and cultural institutions during the Viceroyalty and the nascent Republic; To this was added the fact that its professors, graduates, and even students were part of missions that created various Hispanic American universities. In 1878, during the government of Manuel Pardo, the General Regulation of Public Instruction was issued, instituting the concept of major and minor universities, the first title corresponding to San Marcos and the second to the universities of Arequipa and Cusco. During the War of the Pacific and specifically during the occupation of Lima by Chilean troops, art and cultural objects and assets were taken from the university in order to be taken to Chile by sea. At the end of the 19th century, the “San Fernando" Faculty of Medicine, which was located in a building in the old Plaza de Santa Ana —today Plaza Italia—, moved to its current location in the Orchard of Mestas, that of the historic premises on Avenida Grau, Barrios Altos in the historic center of Lima. Once the war ended, by law of 1901 it is stated that Peruvian university education corresponds to the National University of San Marcos and the minor universities of Trujillo, Cusco, and Arequipa, which were later joined by the Catholic University of Lima and technical schools.

At the beginning of the 20th century, university activists promoted a reform within the University of San Marcos; this effort transcended the limits of the university and became a reflection of a great social movement in Peru. The university reform planned access to education for the middle and popular classes, which until then had a minority presence in San Marcos. These ideals began a long tradition of student activism at the university and altered the Peruvian political landscape. In 1909 the students of the University of San Marcos had active participation in protests against the Peruvian dictatorial governments. In 1916 the Federation of Students of Peru (FEP) was established, led mainly by students from San Marcos. The FEP's demands included university reforms such as updating curricula, removing untrained faculty and eliminating Peruvian government interference in the university. During the government of President Augusto Leguía, the university educational system was reorganized and university autonomy was granted. In 1928, Herbert Hoover, 31st President of the United States, visited Peru. In his speech during the banquet offered by Peruvian President Augusto B. Leguía, the American president highlighted Lima as a "center of civilization" and the Major University of San Marcos as the "dean of knowledge".

From the colonial era, through independence and the republic until 1946, the university was referred to both colloquially and formally —in various treaties and historical documents— as "University of Lima"; that year its name was made official as the Universidad Nacional Mayor de San Marcos, a name that remains to this day. Between the 1950s and 1960s, the influx of more middle-class students at the University of San Marcos led the government to emphasize and create scientific and university research areas. In 1951, as a commemoration of the 400th anniversary of the founding of the University of San Marcos, the university acquires a new piece of land to build the new University City, where the Stadium of the University of San Marcos was inaugurated that same year. On the occasion of the quadricentennial, a ceremony was also held that brought together the rectors of the main Ibero-American universities, who decided to give her the title and recognition of "Dean of America". Due to this —and also given its primacy in the country— the university has since retained the names of the University of Peru and the Dean of the Americas. In 1958, a significant incident occurs during the visit of then Vice President Richard Nixon, who would later become the 37th president of the United States and also the first president to resign after the Watergate scandal. Nixon had scheduled a conference at the University of San Marcos as part of his visit to Latin America, however, this did not take place due to the protest of San Marcos, who spoke out against US policy in the region with phrases such as: Nixon, Go Home!. Given the incident, the conference was transferred to the Catholic University of Lima, where Nixon had a particularly bad reception.

In the mid-1960s, due to the need for even more space, several faculties of the university began to move to the Ciudad Universitaria site, where 17 of the 20 faculties of the university are currently located. This new campus is located in an area that housed archaeological complexes of the Maranga Culture, these were restored and protected —as in the case of Huaca San Marcos—, after having been partially destroyed during the construction of Av. Venezuela in the 1940s. In 1969, the system of organization by academic departments —today academic schools— was also introduced. On September 22, 1984, the current statute of the university was promulgated. With nearly 40,000 students and more than 4,000 faculty, the university offers undergraduate studies in 65 areas, master's degrees in 77, and doctorates in 27, making it the largest academic offer in the country today. It currently has 20 faculties grouped into 6 main blocks, its academic departments publish several specialized journals and it operates 3 important museums in Lima as well as research institutes. According to UNESCO criteria and indicators, the University of San Marcos is the only university in Peru that covers the various areas of knowledge such as pure sciences, human sciences, historical-social sciences, health sciences, economic-business sciences, and techniques and engineering.

Currently, despite the budget limitations in the Peruvian university system, the University of San Marcos is considered the most important and representative Peruvian institution of higher education due to its "tradition, prestige, quality, and admission selectivity", being also recognized as the institution with the highest scientific production in Peru. 

It has been considered the best in Peru according to university rankings such as that of the National Assembly of Rectors of Peru in 2006, which was sponsored by UNESCO, the 2010, 2011 and 2012 University Ranking by Academic Performance produced by the URAP Center, the 2011/2012 and 2012/2013 of the QS World University Rankings, the SIR World Report prepared by SCImago Research Center in 2009, 2010 and 2011; the 2020 and 2022 Scopus national scientific production ranking, the University Web Ranking by 4ICU of 2015 and 2016, and the world ranking of Webometrics universities of the Spanish National Research Council for 2011-I, 2012-I, and 2021, in which it was located in the 1st place. 

In addition, it has a 10-year institutional license granted by the National Superintendence of Higher University Education (SUNEDU) and international institutional accreditations that certify its academic and administrative quality.

Different influential Peruvians and Latin Americans have left their classrooms; all acknowledging and valuing the high level of teaching of the university as the main educational entity in the country, as well as highlighting the active and important intellectual participation that the university and its students had throughout the history of Peru. The University of San Marcos has been referred to many times as a reflection of Peru for having manifested and been part of the limitations and problems that eventually affected the country, however, the diversity and preparation of its students is recognized. 

In 2010, the Nobel Prize was awarded to a Peruvian for the first time, Mario Vargas Llosa, was awarded this distinction. Vargas Llosa is one of the most illustrious students that the University of San Marcos has had, in this sense, the university awarded him the title of Doctor honoris causa in 2001. As a tribute for obtaining the Nobel Prize, on March 30, 2011, within the framework of the celebrations for its 460th anniversary, the University of San Marcos distinguished Vargas Llosa with his highest decoration: the San Marcos Medal of Honor in the degree of Grand Cross; He also created a chair that bears his name and opened a museum room about the writer and his years in his alma mater. The ceremony was held in the "Casona de San Marcos" and was attended by intellectuals from San Marcos who have also been colleagues, friends and teachers of Vargas Llosa. In 2018, the Meritorious Society Founders of Independence recognized the National University of San Marcos as a Meritorious institution by virtue of its participation, value, and historical significance in the construction and defense of Peru, also placing the university's banner in the Hall of the Heroes. In 2019, the university awards, for the first time in its modern history, a doctoral degree based on a thesis written and defended entirely in Quechua, thus marking a historic milestone for the development of research in Native American languages in the country and the region.

About the importance of the University of San Marcos in the history of Peru and America, the Liberator Simón Bolívar said the day he received the degree of Doctor Honoris Causa:

About the importance of the University of San Marcos as the oldest Pan American university institution, Albert Einstein expressed when receiving the degree of Doctor Honoris Causa in the framework of the 400th anniversary of the university commemorated in 1951:

About the importance of the University of San Marcos, Mario Vargas Llosa, Nobel Prize for Literature 2010, said the day he was decorated by his alma mater:

The first and oldest university in America 

The National University of San Marcos, founded on May 12, 1551, is the oldest university in the Americas, being the university that has been in continuous operation for the longest time since its foundation, and the only one of the American universities founded during the 16th century. to remain in operation without permanent closure from then to the present. The continuous operation is relevant when observing the cases of several universities founded in the colonial era that were finally closed during the Spanish-American wars of independence or due to internal conflicts. Due to its age and continuity, and on the occasion of the four hundredth anniversary of its foundation, in 1951 a ceremony was held that brought together the rectors of the main Ibero-American universities, who decided to give it the title and recognition of "Dean of the Americas".

Regarding the primacy of a university in America, there are two universities that can receive this distinction:

 The National University of San Marcos, which was the first university founded by Royal Provision and authorized by Royal Decree in America, on May 12, 1551. This implies that it was the first university officially and solemnly constituted by the Spanish Crown in America, that is, fulfilling all the royal and canonical formalities required at the time. The General Archive of the Indies, which has documents from the Spanish colonial period between the 16th and 18th centuries, does not contain official documents prior to 1551 that recognize a university or institution of higher education prior to the University of San Marcos.
 The University of Santo Tomás de Aquino, which has an unofficial priority among the universities of America based on the bull in Apostolatus Culmine of Paul III, dated October 28, 1538. However, it did not have the royal pass of the King Charles I of Spain, that is, did not have the required royal approval until February 23, 1558. On August 2, 1758, King Ferdinand VI of Spain would issue a royal decree prohibiting the University of Santo Tomás from calling itself the primacy of America, as such historical attribution did not correspond to it above the universities of San Marcos in Lima, Mexico and others in the Americas. Centuries later, the University of Santo Tomás de Aquino would be closed at the beginning of the 19th century due to internal wars in the Dominican Republic.

It is important to mention that both the University of San Marcos and the University of Santo Tomás de Aquino —and by extension the Royal and Pontifical University of Mexico— began to function as general studies and to deliver degrees on undetermined dates before becoming official as universities, the reason for which it is necessary for historians to establish starting points for the origin of the first universities in America, these being the documents with which the foundation of each university was authorized. The legal and real validity of each document remains in debate, as well as the results of future historical-legal research on the emergence of the university and higher education in America.

University symbols 
Since its foundation in 1551, the University of San Marcos has had various institutional symbols, among which the following stand out:
 Emblem: Since its foundation until 1574, the first official shield showed an image of the Virgen del Rosario, considered the patron saint of the Dominican friars; on the right, a representation of the Pacific Ocean and below a lime —fruit, referring to the city of Lima—. The coat of arms was approved by King Carlos I of Spain in 1551. By the end of 1570, after the papal bull of Pius V, the coat of arms was modified, replacing the image of the Virgen del Rosario with that of the new patron of the university, the apostle Saint Mark and the Lion. The colors that were used in that coat of arms are ignored since the documents in the century were only black and white. It was not until 1929 that the colors: blue for the ocean, black or brown for the image of the saint, light blue for the background, and silver for the columns, became widespread. The second original shield with the image of San Marcos has been the longest-lasting symbol of the university: it was used for almost four hundred years. In 1929 the original colors mentioned in the ancient texts were officially introduced: blue for the ocean, black or brown for the image of the saint, light blue for the background, and silver for the columns, etc. This last update of the shield is the one that is used today, following a tradition that dates back to the middle of the century. Below is the original description given on the shield by the Constitution of the University of San Marcos of 1578:

 Flag: In ancient manuscripts there are references to an official banner of the University of San Marcos, it was indicated that it was composed of the university's major shield centered on a white background; this description gave rise to the appearance of banners and flags of the university that followed these patterns during the 17th, 18th and 19th centuries. During the 20th century, concern arose to formalize the use of a single institutional flag for the university. Although the use of a white flag with the shield of the university in the center had already been generalized, its use was recently made official through a rectoral resolution on June 14, 2010, indicating that for historical reasons it was decided to place the official emblem: shield of the university, on a white background that contains all the chromatic possibilities of the light spectrum, referring to the variety of colors that individually distinguish each faculty in academic and sports activities.
 Anthem: The university anthem is regularly performed at special ceremonies and anniversaries of the University of San Marcos, mainly by the University Choir. The lyrics of the anthem were composed by Manuel Tarazona Camacho and the music by Luis Craff Zevallos.

The National University of San Marcos also mentions other symbolic documents for the university. Among them are the Royal Certificate by which King Carlos I of Spain authorized the foundation of the university in 1551, and the Quipu found in the Huaca San Marcos, both remain in the custody of the university as documents and materials of high historical value.

Administration and organization

Government

The University of San Marcos was originally governed by clerics of monastic orders; during the Age of Enlightenment, the Bourbon Reforms transformed it into a secular institution, which continues to this day.

Currently, the governing bodies of the university are:
 University Assembly: It is the highest governing body in the university. It is made up of the rector and the two vice-rectors, the deans of the faculties, the director of the graduate school, representatives of the teachers, and representatives of the students —which constitute a third of the total number of members of the assembly—, representatives of the graduates, and the president of the Federation of students of the University of San Marcos with the right to speak, without a vote. Administrative officials of the highest level can also attend the assembly, when they are required as advisors, without the right to vote. The main attributions of the university assembly are: the modification of the statute of the university, requiring in such case the majority of its capable members; approval of the General Plan for the development and operation of the university and carry out its evaluation annually; pronounce and intervene in matters of general interest of the university and in special cases requested by the university council; in the same way, it is in charge of the election of the rector and vice-rectors, as well as declaring the vacancy of these positions.
 University Council: It is the body in charge of the direction and execution of the university. It is made up of the rector —who chairs it—, the two vice-rectors, the deans of the faculties, the director of the graduate school, student representatives —a third of the total number of council members—, a representative of the graduates and the president of the Federation of students with the right to speak, without a vote. Just as in the university assembly, administrative officials of the highest level can attend the council when they are required as advisers, without the right to vote. The powers of the council are: to formulate the general plan for the development and operation of the university, as well as to establish its policies; formulate and approve the general regulations of the university, the election regulations and other special regulations and present them to the university assembly for its ratification, confer academic degrees and professional titles approved by the faculties, grant honorary distinctions, recognize and revalidate studies and recognize degrees and titles from foreign universities when the university is authorized to do so.
 Rectorate: The Rectorate is the university's governing body consisting mainly of the Rector. The rector is the first executive authority of the university, as well as its legal representative and its institutional image. The University of San Marcos has had 216 rectors since its foundation, various characters have assumed the rectorship of the university throughout the viceregal and republican era of Peru, so the rector magnificus is also a symbol of institutional continuity since the foundation. until the present. The current rector is Mrs. Jeri Ramón Ruffner, a certified public accountant, who is also the first woman elected to this institutional position.
 Vice-Rectorate: It is made up of two vice-rectors: one undergraduate academic and the other for research and postgraduate. The current ones in charge are Carlos Carranza and José Niño

The government and administration of the faculties and schools are in charge of the Deans and the School Directors, respectively. In addition, the postgraduate units of each faculty are in charge of their respective directors, with the Director of the Graduate School as the general director.

Academics

Admission
Admission for undergraduate studies is mainly through an entrance examination. Although there are ways to carry out a special exam in the case of transfers, foreigners, first places in schools, and for the disabled, the most required type of exam is the ordinary one that is carried out twice a year: in March and in September. The entrance exam of the National University of San Marcos is considered the most rigorous admission exam for undergraduate studies in Peru, being statistically the most selective at the national level; This is mainly due to its difficulty and the large number of applicants that the university has. Precisely, this is expressed in the very strong competition that is generated in the admission of new students, with approximately 60,000 applicants per year for around 6,000 vacancies —divided into two admission processes: March and September, and which includes applicants who take the ordinary general exam and/or the pre-university center exam—, the selectivity ratio in admission being approximately 10%. Since 2016, the new evaluation method for each admission contest is the application of the cognitive skills test to the applicants (Test DECO®), which seeks that the applicants demonstrate ability and critical reasoning, before theorizing and memorizing when responding to different topics evaluated. It consists of an evaluation of 100 questions −30 of skills (5 in English language) and 70 of knowledge- which lasts three hours. In the case of postgraduate studies, both for master's degrees, specializations and doctorates, admission is made through enrollment in the Postgraduate School of the University of San Marcos. As there are a limited number of vacancies, an admission exam is carried out that is prepared and graded by a special jury according to the area of study to which it is applied. There is also high competition in this process. In 2020, after the suspension of the first admission exam on March 12, due to the COVID-19 pandemic, and after spending more than 6 months without applying it, the University Council decided to approve the application of the online admission exam, being the first of its kind in the history of the university, on October 2 and 3 of that same year.

Faculties
The University of San Marcos has 20 faculties grouped into 5 academic areas, in which 65 undergraduate programs, 77 master's degrees, and 27 doctorates are offered; Thus, it is the university with the largest number of study programs, both for undergraduate and postgraduate courses, in Peru. Currently, the organization of the university by academic areas is supervised by its Undergraduate Academic Vice-rectorate.

Health Sciences 

The area of Health Sciences is made up of the following faculties:

 Faculty of Medicine «San Fernando» (FMSF): It is the Faculty of Human Medicine of the University of San Marcos, also called the "San Fernando" Faculty of Medicine, it is the first medical school in Peru. Its history dates back to the first chairs of medicine outlined among the first ones taught at the University of San Marcos in the 16th century, after the creation of the Royal College of Medicine and Surgery of San Fernando in 1811, and finally to its official installation as faculty on October 6, 1856, by Cayetano Heredia. The faculty also colloquially receives the name Faculty of Medicine of Lima. At present it offers undergraduate, specialization, and postgraduate studies in its professional schools of human medicine, obstetrics, nursing, medical technology and nutrition. San Fernando sends abroad and receives students from abroad through the Student Exchange Section (SIE), approximately 40% of its graduates carry out their postgraduate studies abroad. In the National Medical Exams in Peru (ENAM), the "San Fernando" Faculty of Medicine has obtained first place on numerous occasions.
 Faculty of Pharmacy and Biochemistry (FFB): It is the first university-level institution to train pharmaceutical chemists in Peru. Its origins go back to the creation of the Protoboticary in 1808 and the inclusion of pharmacy teaching in the synoptic table of the curriculum of the College of Medicine, Pharmacy, and Surgery. In 1931 the School of Pharmacy was created. It would not be until October 29, 1943, that the law approved the creation of the Faculty of Pharmacy and Biochemistry. The faculty currently offers studies of undergraduate, specialization, and postgraduate; in its professional schools of: pharmacy and biochemistry, food science and toxicology.
 Faculty of Dentistry (FO): Dentistry was born as a profession at the national level as a section of the Faculty of Medicine of the University of San Marcos in the year 1868. It would not be until 1920 that these studies became independent with the creation of the Institute of Dentistry. The following year this institute was incorporated into the university and the Faculty of Dentistry was officially created. At present, the premises of the faculty are located on the university campus and offer the teaching of studies of undergraduate, specializations and postgraduate; in its professional school of dentistry. It also has dental clinics serving the community.
 Faculty of Veterinary Medicine (FMV): The teaching of veterinary medicine in Peru begins with the National School of Agronomy. On the other hand, in 1940 the Veterinary Section was created at the Chorrillos Military School, which in 1943 would become the Military School of Veterinary Sciences. In 1944 the two aforementioned schools came together, creating the National School of Veterinary Sciences, which in 1946 would become the current Faculty of Veterinary Medicine, beginning the teaching of veterinary medicine at the university level in Peru.In 1956, the faculty moved to its current location in San Borja. Being the pioneer faculty in the teaching of veterinary medicine in Peru, it currently offers studies of undergraduate, specialization, and postgraduate; in its professional school of veterinary medicine. It also has a veterinary clinic serving the community.
 Faculty of Psychology (FPSI): The first antecedent of the study of psychology in Peru is the creation of the Psychology Section in 1955 as part of the Faculty of Letters of the University of San Marcos. In 1963 the Department of Psychology was created and from then on, along with the development of experimental psychology worldwide, the creation of the Faculty of Psychology began to take shape, an initiative promoted by the German psychologist Walter Blumenfeld; which is officially created in 1988, being the first in Peru. At the moment the faculty offers the studies of undergraduate, specialization, and postgraduate; in its professional school of: psychology, with pre-specialties in clinical, organizational, social-community and educational psychology, and in his professional school of: organizational psychology and human management. It has various experimental psychology laboratories, a toy library, a teaching clinic, and psychological clinics at the service of the community, among others.

The following table lists the faculties that makeup area A, as well as the professional schools that make it up:

Basic Sciences 
The Basic Sciences area is made up of the following faculties:

 Faculty of Chemistry and Chemical Engineering (FQIQ): It has its background in the Faculty of Sciences at the University of San Marcos, created on April 7, 1855. On that date, the studies of chemistry in San Marcos were formally started by the Italian doctors Antonio Raimondi and José Eboli. In 1935, the specialty of chemistry was created at the university. In 1946, then President José Luis Bustamante y Rivero promulgated Law 10555, which created the Faculty of Chemistry at the University of San Marcos. On April 24, 1964, the study of chemical engineering was introduced, with which the faculty acquired the current name of Faculty of Chemistry and Chemical Engineering. It offers studies of undergraduate, specialization, and postgraduate; in its professional schools of chemistry, chemical engineering, and agro-industrial engineering.

 Faculty of Biological Sciences (FCB): It has its background in the creation of the Faculty of Mathematics and Natural Sciences, on August 28, 1861, which included the chair of natural history. On March 15, 1866, it became independent as the Faculty of Sciences; It then included the area of natural history, the subjects of mineralogy, geology, botany, and zoology. The first dean was Antonio Raimondi, an Italian scholar of the natural sciences of Peru. Since the beginning of the 20th century, it has been in charge of the Natural History Museum of Lima and other research institutes. In the middle of the 20th century, there was a reform of the biological sciences study program and the granting of the professional title of biologist was established. It currently offers studies of undergraduate, specialization, and postgraduate; in its professional schools of biological sciences, genetics and biotechnology, and microbiology and parasitology.

 Faculty of Physical Sciences (FCF): The studies of classical physics began in the Faculty of Mathematical Sciences of the University of San Marcos in the middle of the 19th century. However, the study of modern physics was not officially instituted until 1966, with the creation of the Faculty of Physical Sciences. It currently offers studies of undergraduate, specialization, and postgraduate; in their professional schools of physics, and mechanical engineering of fluids. He is in charge of the university's Historical Museum of Physical Sciences and the Institute of Physical Research.

 Faculty of Mathematical Sciences (FCM): The Faculty of Mathematical Sciences began its operation in the year 1850. In 1862 it was called the Faculty of Natural Sciences and Mathematics, later in 1876 it took the name of the Faculty of Sciences. Renowned scientists and mathematicians such as Federico Villarreal and Santiago Antúnez de Mayolo would emerge from this faculty. At the end of the 20th century, the initiative to create the current National University of Engineering would arise from this faculty. Today, the faculty is called the Faculty of Mathematical Sciences, and it is located in Ciudad Universitaria. It offers studies of: undergraduate, specializations and postgraduate; in their professional schools of: mathematical sciences, statistics, operations research and computational science.

The following table lists the faculties that makeup area B, as well as the professional schools that make it up:

Engineering 
The Engineering area is made up of the following faculties:

 Faculty of Geological, Mining, Metallurgical, and Geographical Engineering (FIGMMG): The teaching of geological engineering began when the specialty of geology was created in 1935, later in 1968 the academic programs of geology and geological engineering were created. In 1971 the academic-professional School of Metallurgical Engineering was created. The School of Mining Engineering was created on November 5, 1980. The School of Geographic Engineering was created the next day, on November 6, 1980. In 1983, the university assembly approved the creation of the Faculty of Geology, Mines, Metallurgy, Geographical Sciences, and Fluid Mechanics, that integrated these professional schools. In 1991 the faculty is restructured and the school of fluid mechanics becomes part of the Faculty of Physical Sciences. In 2009 and 2014, the School of Civil Engineering and the School of Environmental Engineering were created respectively; this being the final conformation of the current Faculty of Geological, Mining, Metallurgical and Geographic Engineering. It currently offers studies of: undergraduate, specialization, and postgraduate; in its professional schools of geological engineering, mining engineering, metallurgical engineering, geographic engineering, civil engineering and environmental engineering.

 Faculty of Industrial Engineering (FII): It has its main antecedent in the industrial engineering academic program, established in 1969. However, this program did not function independently until 1982, the year in which it was separated from the specialties of electronic engineering and fluid mechanics engineering. It would not be until December 7, 1988, that the university assembly would create the current Faculty of Industrial Engineering, the same one that is consolidated in its organization, with the perspective of fully fulfilling the role that corresponds to it according to its study programs. It offers studies of undergraduate, specializations, and postgraduate; in its professional schools of industrial engineering, textile engineering, and occupational health and safety engineering.

 Faculty of Electronic and Electrical Engineering (FIEE): It has its origins in the initial electrical and electronic courses at the Faculty of Physical Sciences. Subsequently, these studies would become independent of the faculty and would jointly constitute a new one, the current Faculty of Electronic and Electrical Engineering of the University of San Marcos. It currently offers studies of undergraduate, specialization, and postgraduate; in their professional schools of electronic engineering, electrical engineering, and telecommunications engineering.

 Faculty of Systems Engineering and Informatics (FISI): Its main antecedent is the School of Computing founded with the collaboration of the French government in the Faculty of Mathematical Sciences in 1969, being the first school of computing, systems, and informatics in Peru. In 1996, these studies became independent with the creation of the academic-professional school of Systems Engineering. On October 30, 2000, by rectory resolution, the Faculty of Systems Engineering and Informatics of the University of San Marcos was created. He is currently in charge of the University's Computer Science Center. It offers studies of undergraduate, specialization, and postgraduate; in its professional schools of systems engineering, and software engineering.

The following table lists the faculties that makeup area C, as well as the professional schools that make it up:

Economics and Management Sciences 

The area of Economics and Management Sciences is made up of the following faculties:

 Faculty of Administrative Sciences (FCA): It has its beginnings in the administration studies given at the Faculty of Political and Administrative Sciences, created in 1875. In 1920 the faculty changed its name to the Faculty of Political and Economic Sciences, restructuring its curricular plan. In 1943 it changed its name again to the Faculty of Economic and Commercial Sciences. Around 1960 the faculty had the School of Administrators. In 1984, the creation of an independent faculty for the study of administration was established, which is the current Faculty of Administrative Sciences. The faculty currently offers studies of undergraduate, specialization, and postgraduate; in its professional schools of administration, tourism administration, and international business administration.

 Faculty of Accounting Sciences (FCC): It originates with the accounting studies given at the Faculty of Political and Administrative Sciences, created in 1875. In 1920 the faculty changed its name to the Faculty of Political and Economic Sciences, restructuring its curricular plan. In 1943 it changed its name again to the Faculty of Economic and Commercial Sciences. Around 1960, the faculty had the School of Accountants. In 1984, the creation of an independent faculty for the study of accounting was established, which is the current Faculty of Accounting Sciences of the University of San Marcos. It currently offers studies of undergraduate, specialization, and postgraduate; in its professional schools of accounting, tax management, and business and public auditing.

 Faculty of Economic Sciences (FCE): It has its background in economics studies given at the Faculty of Political and Administrative Sciences, created in 1875. In 1920 the faculty changed its name to the Faculty of Political and Economic Sciences, restructuring its curricular plan. In 1943 it changed its name again to the Faculty of Economic and Commercial Sciences. Around 1960, the faculty had the School of Economists. In 1984, the creation of an independent faculty for the study of economics was established, which is the current Faculty of Economic Sciences. It offers studies of undergraduate, specialization, and postgraduate; in its professional schools of economics, public economics. and international economics.

The following table lists the faculties that makeup area D, as well as the professional schools that make it up:

Humanities, and Legal and Social Sciences 
The area of Humanities and Legal and Social Sciences is made up of the following faculties:

 Faculty of Letters and Human Sciences (FLCH): It has its antecedents in the founding of the University of San Marcos, when it had the faculties of theology and arts, which would later derive in the Faculty of Letters that would develop its main activities in the Court of Letters of the Casona de San Marcos. In 1854 and under the government of Ramón Castilla, it adopted the name of Faculty of Philosophy and Humanities; In 1876, the title of the Faculty of Letters was returned to him. At the beginning of the 20th century, the faculty changed its name several times to include new programs, until in 1965 the current name of the Faculty of Letters and Human Sciences was fixed. It is currently located in the University City. It offers studies of undergraduate, specialization, and postgraduate; in its professional schools of literature, philosophy, linguistics, social communication, art, library and information sciences, dance, and conservation and restoration. The faculty is in charge of various research institutes, museums such as the Museum of Art and the Language Center of the University of San Marcos.

 Faculty of Education (FEDU): It has its antecedents in the chair of Pedagogy dictated at the University of San Marcos from March 18, 1876, with the authorization of the then president of Peru Manuel Pardo y Lavalle. From 1901, the chair of Pedagogy was part of the curriculum of the Faculty of Philosophy and Letters as a compulsory course. On December 14, 1925, the Pedagogy section was created in the Faculty of Letters. It would not be until April 24, 1946, that with the promulgation of the University Statute of 1946, the Faculty of Education was created at the University of San Marcos. In 1984, the professional schools that it has today were created. It currently offers studies of undergraduate, specialization, and postgraduate; in its professional schools of education and physical education. Located mainly in the University City, it also has the San Marcos Application College, located in the district of Lince.

 Faculty of Law and Political Science (FDCP): Its antecedents date back to the founding of the University of San Marcos in 1551, when the Colegio Real Felipe was created within the university for the teaching of law. In 1770, the historic Real Convictorio de San Carlos was founded — merging the existing San Felipe College of Law and the San Martín College of Philosophy and Law. In these cloisters several ideologues of the South American emancipatory feat were formed. During the government of Augusto B. Leguía, the Faculty of Jurisprudence was transformed into the Faculty of Law. On June 28, 1935, a new university statute was issued, in which it was called the Faculty of Law and Political Science as it is known to this day. Currently located in the Ciudad Universitaria, it offers studies of undergraduate, specialization, and postgraduate; in their professional schools of: law and political science. It also has a free legal office at the service of the community.

 Faculty of Social Sciences (FCS): The history of the faculty goes back to the creation of the first chairs of social studies, such as those of history from 1857, that of sociology from 1896, and that of archeology from 1920. In 1969, with the promulgation of the Organic Law of the Peruvian University, the Department of Historical-Social Sciences is created at the University of San Marcos. On September 24, 1984, in accordance with the University Law, a new administrative academic structure was established, creating the Faculty of Social Sciences, grouping the social studies programs taught at the university. Currently located in the University City, it offers studies of undergraduate, specialization, and postgraduate; in their professional schools of history, sociology, anthropology, archaeology, social work and geography. The faculty is in charge of the university's Museum of Archeology and Anthropology.

The following table lists the faculties that makeup area E, as well as the professional schools that make it up:

Campuses
Since its foundation, the University of San Marcos has passed through five different main locations, having two main transfers during the 16th century, one in the mid-19th century, and the last one in the mid-20th century:

 16th, 17th, 18th and 19th centuries: The first one, the premises of the Convent of Nuestra Señora del Rosario of the Dominican Order; the second one, near the outskirts of San Marcelo, where shortly before the Convent of the Order of San Agustín had functioned; the third —since 1575— in the primitive Plaza del Estanque, later called the Plaza de la Inquisición, the current location of the Congress of Peru.
 19th and 20th centuries: In the second half of the 19th century, it was moved to the premises of the old Convictorio de San Carlos —a San Marcos residence at that time—, today the Cultural Center of the University of San Marcos operates in said premises. In the same way, at the end of the 19th century, the "San Fernando" Faculty of Medicine moved to its permanent location on the current Avenida Grau.
 20th and 21st centuries: Since the mid-1960s, during the government of Manuel Prado, the university began to occupy its main campus, the current Ciudad Universitaria, located between Avenida Universitaria and Avenida Venezuela. The rectory, the central library and 17 of the 20 faculties of the university are currently located there.

University city 

Since 1966, the University City of the National University of San Marcos, generally known as “University City of Lima” or simply “University City”, is the main campus of the National University of San Marcos and the focal point of Universitary Av. — by giving this its name and for being the point from which this road expands both north and south. Its main entrances are located at Universitaria Av., Venezuela Av., Germán Amézaga Av. and Óscar Benavides Av.—formerly Colonial Av.—, in the Lima district. In the University City of the National University of San Marcos the main administrative facilities of the university are located, such as the rectory. In it are located 17 of the 20 faculties of the University of San Marcos, the central library, the Stadium of the University of San Marcos, the university gymnasium, the dining room of the University City and one of the university residences. In addition, the City includes the archaeological complex of Huaca San Marcos, which is preserved and studied by students and researchers from San Marcos.

Since 2007, road works have been carried out outside the University City. The works imposed by the former mayor Luis Castañeda of the Metropolitan Municipality of Lima were widely questioned by the students, due to the fact that he intended to mutilate almost 29,000 square meters of the campus, and because the construction of a ring road would imply the disappearance of areas green areas and part of the buffer zone necessary for academic activities on campus. In 2008, specialists from the National University of Engineering and the CDL-College of Engineers of Peru joined the timely student request for the reformulation of the municipal works, pointing out that these works were oversized, that they lacked support enough technicians and that there were other options for traffic flows in the area. Currently, the works are paralyzed by a precautionary measure from the National Institute of Culture (INC), after verifying that these works damaged part of the cultural heritage in the Huaca San Marcos. Once the management of former mayor Luis Castañeda has ended, an agreement is expected between the new management of mayoress Susana Villarán and the university, which means a better benefit for both parties and for the neighbors, preserving the integrity of the Huaca San Marcos, conserving the buffer zone and green areas of the campus, and not incurring in unjustified and badly designed constructions. In January 2011, the new municipal management recognized that the ring road was unnecessary, agreeing with the position of the University of San Marcos, which was supported by the evaluations of specialists from the College of Engineers of Peru and the National University of Engineering. Representatives of the university took this news in the best way, pending a conciliation and agreement to adjust the work for the university population and the Lima commune.

Central Library 

Since 1768 the university sought to establish —in addition to the collections of each faculty— a central library, however, this would not come to fruition until 1871. Looted during the Chilean occupation during the War of the Pacific, at the beginning of the 20th a modernization process undertaken by the librarian Pedro Zulen and the Peruvian historian Jorge Basadre, a process that achieved the total reorganization and cataloging of the existing titles. The current "Pedro Zulen" Central Library of the university is the culmination of various computerization and modernization projects. The central library works in a 19,800 m² building, making it the largest university library in Peru and one of the largest in Latin America. It is made up of four buildings linked together, has five levels, and is located in the Civic Plaza of the university campus.

The building has the capacity to serve 2,500 users simultaneously. It has a multifunctional stage, 400 seats, and various high-tech systems that allow surveillance by video cameras, Internet connection, videoconference systems, multimedia projectors, radio links, and professional audio and sound equipment. The library has all its automated processes, such as those related to the acquisition of university publications, as well as the cataloging and classification of the texts and resources offered by the library. The university seeks to digitize all the information of national origin found in the library through its virtual library service, thus in the medium term it would include collections of newspapers and magazines —dating back to the 18th century—, books by renowned Peruvian authors and important works that, due to their small number or being unique copies, are of restricted use. The Central Library "Pedro Zulen", under the auspices of UNESCO, leads the initiative to develop and implement digitalization and electronic publication processes in the area of these and other documents, using international standards such as OAI-PMH, TEI Lite, Dublin Core, ETD-MS, XML, among others. This initiative which has received the name of Cybertesis of the University of San Marcos is currently the largest repository in Peru.

Library system 
Each one of the faculties of the National University of San Marcos has its own specialized library in the study areas of each faculty, these are connected to each other through the Library System (SISBIB) of the university. Currently, in addition to the library system, the University of San Marcos has the "Pedro Zulen" Central Library, which includes most of the university's titles, and which directs the main activity of SISBIB. In addition to the central library and the libraries of each faculty located in the University City, the SISBIB is also in charge of four specialized libraries located like other university dependencies: Spain Library of the Arts, Library "Raúl Porras Barrenechea Institute", Library of the Museum of Natural History "Javier Prado", and Library-Museum "Temple-Radicati".

University clinic 

The current San Marcos University Clinic, inaugurated in February 1998 by reorganizing the previous clinical offices, is located within the university campus. At this health center, care is provided to students, retirees, teachers, administrative staff and the neighboring community, performing operations and other emergency cases due to trauma, burns, and serious injuries. It provides pharmacy, radiology, respiratory disease care, diabetes screening, AIDS screening, psychology, dentistry, gynecology, cosmetic surgery, etc. Regularly carries out, in conjunction with other institutions, vaccination, blood donation and sexual education campaigns.

University Residence 

The University of San Marcos has two residence halls for its two main campuses:

 The University City Residence Hall is located on the main campus, between Avenida Universitaria and Avenida Venezuela. It houses male and female students; provincials from the coast, mountains, and jungle of Peru; of all specialties. This residence currently houses 101 students.

 The Julio C. Tello Residence Hall is located at Av. Grau 1190, near the "San Fernando" School of Medicine of the University of San Marcos. This campus houses provincial students —only males— of all specialties. It currently has 92 students.

Stadium of the University of San Marcos 

The Stadium of the National University of San Marcos, officially known as the "Colossus of America", is located practically in the center of the University City. Its main accesses are through the block 5 of Av. Amézaga and the block 36 of Av. Venezuela, in the city of Lima, Peru. It was inaugurated in 1951 commemorating the 400th anniversary of the founding of the University of San Marcos. The San Marcos stadium initially had a total capacity of 70,000 people, becoming at the time the stadium with the highest capacity in Peru. It has recently been conditioned to an official capacity of 32,000 people. The remodeled venue will be the official venue for the 2019 South American U-17 Championship and the 2019 Pan American Games.

At the local level, it has been the official stadium of the university soccer team, Club Deportivo Universidad San Marcos, which played until 2011 in the Second Division of Peru. In addition to sports practice, the stadium has also been used as a space for the devleopment of extra-curricular activities for students, teachers and administrative staff of the University of San Marcos. In recent years it has also been the scene of massive concerts, featuring bands and artists such as Metallica, Korn, Gustavo Cerati, Marc Anthony, Bon Jovi, Green Day, The Smashing Pumpkins, Fania All-Stars, Iron Maiden, Shakira, Slayer, Van Halen, Bad Religion, Juanes, Aerosmith, Pearl Jam, Noel Gallagher, Lady Gaga, etc.

Casona of the National University of San Marcos

The Cultural Center "La Casona" of San Marcos (acronym: CCSM), commonly known as "La Casona" of the University Park, is the main historical site of the university. Founded as the headquarters of the Jesuit novitiate of Saint Antony Aboot, it became the central headquarters of the university in 1861, remaining as such until the 1960s, when the university moved to its current campus in the University City of Lima. After its recent restoration, the "Casona" is the main reference of the cultural and artistic activity of the University, and one of the best-preserved constructions of the colonial era in the city of Lima. It is one of the main tourist attractions of the Historic Center of Lima. The complex is part of the area and the list of buildings in the historic center of the capital that in 1988 was declared a World Heritage Site by UNESCO.

San Fernando Campus
The Faculty of Medicine of the National University of San Marcos "San Fernando" (acronym: FMSF-UNMSM) is one of the twenty faculties that make up the said university. The faculty, within the organization of the university, is part of the Health Sciences area and has the Schools of Human Medicine, Obstetrics, Nursing, Medical Technology, and Nutrition, which offer both undergraduate and graduate studies. The Faculty of Medicine is also the focal point of the San Fernando campus, which has the largest number of faculties and schools related to the health sciences. The campus is located in Barrios Altos. Within the campus there is also the Faculty of Pharmacy and Biochemistry, the Botanical Garden of Lima, a university dining room (Cangallo), the Medical Student Center and its academy; and there is also the Central Morgue of Lima.

Faculty of Veterinary Medicine 
Faculty that has only the School of Veterinary Medicine, which offers both undergraduate and postgraduate studies. The campus has the school buildings, a hospital for little and exotic animals, a university dining room, and the postgraduate classrooms. It is located on its own campus in the district of San Borja (ex fundo Cahuache).

Research 

Throughout its history, the National University of San Marcos has significantly contributed to the scientific development of Peru. Currently, the National University of San Marcos is one of the few Peruvian universities that conduct research – only 10 out of over 80 universities. This is mostly due to the fact the national government has not properly financed research development in the last decades.

Regarding the development of research activities in San Marcos, halfway through the 20th century, the Peruvian government issued provisions to place emphasis on and create areas of scientific and student-led research. As a result, throughout these years many museums and institutes have been created within San Marcos to promote research in different areas of human knowledge. During the last years of the decade of 1990 and the beginning of 2000, the university renewed its research system through the assignation of specific projects to diverse academic departments.

Research Institutes 
Currently, the University of San Marcos has 37 academic research units usually referred to as institutes. Each of these are grouped according to the academic area in which they carry out their research, thus they are classified mainly in the areas of: health sciences, basic sciences, engineering, economic and management sciences, and humanities and legal and social sciences. According to their areas of study, the research centers have museums and specialized laboratories where they exhibit and carry out studies on subjects related to their areas. Each institute also has its own publications where they present reports and results of the work and studies of their researchers. In addition to these institutes, the University of San Marcos is also in charge of other important institutes, museums, cultural centers, libraries, and seminaries in Lima that —in a non-compulsory way— carry out research jointly with their related faculties.

Since 2015, after winning the first competition for centers of excellence convened by the National Council of Science and Technology (CONCYTEC), the University of San Marcos also has the Center for Technological, Biomedical and Environmental Research (acronym: CITBM), This being the first center of excellence in Peru dedicated to the integration of scientific research with development and technological innovation. It is led by the University of San Marcos and is made up of three national companies and three international centers of excellence. It also has several national and international collaborators. The center's two lines of research are: biotechnology and health; and water, soil and society.

Below is a list of the main research institutes of the University of San Marcos:

Some of the previously mentioned research institutes of the University of San Marcos are described below: 

 Clinical Research Institute: It is the institute in charge of stimulating, coordinating, and carrying out basic and applied research in medicine, in the context of problems of national or regional interest.

 Center for Research in Biochemistry and Nutrition "Alberto Guzmán Barrón": Founded in 1957, it is the center responsible for basic and applied scientific research in the fields of biochemistry, nutrition, health, molecular biology, molecular genetics, and related areas, giving priority to lines of research that help solve problems of national interest.

 National Institute of Andean Biology: It is the body responsible for research aimed at better understanding the problems of life at altitude, in genetic, morphological, biochemical, physiological, pathological, sociological, anthropological aspects, etc.

 Institute of Pathology: It is the unit in charge of contributing to research and national scientific-technical development in the field of human pathology.

 Institute of Tropical Medicine "Daniel A. Carrión" (IMT): It was created in 1963 by an agreement between the German government and the University of San Marcos, it was the first specialized institute for research and treatment of tropical and infectious diseases in Peru. Thanks to this institute, the "San Fernando" School of Medicine has been designated by the Ministry of Health of Peru as the main reference center for leprosy throughout the country. Currently, it offers the community, mainly low-income people, specialized medical care in infectious and tropical diseases, both in outpatient clinics and laboratory analysis, at affordable prices.

 Institute of Ethics in Health: Body in charge of guaranteeing the ethical development of medical and health research produced by the university.

 Research Unit of the Faculty of Pharmacy and Biochemistry: It is in charge of planning and coordinating the research activities of both the Institute of Biological Chemistry, Microbiology and Biotechnology, and the "Juan de Dios Guevara" Institute of Natural and Therapeutic Resources. Likewise, it develops workshops and research conferences in coordination with the institutes of his faculty.

 Research Institute of Pharmaceutical Sciences and Natural Resources "Juan de Dios Guevara": It is the university body responsible for research on pharmaceutical sciences and on natural and therapeutic resources.

 Institute for Research in Biological Chemistry, Microbiology, and Biotechnology "Marco Antonio Garrido Malo": It is the body in charge of research in biological chemistry, microbiology, and biotechnology at the university.

 Latin American Center for Teaching and Research in Food Bacteriology: It is the unit of the university responsible for developing research and training in food bacteriology.

 Stomatological Research Institute: It is the unit responsible for the university's stomatology research, as well as its publication and dissemination through its academic journal and scientific conferences.

 Veterinary Institute of Tropical and Altitude Research (IVITA): Created in 1961, it is the belonging research center in charge of research in veterinary medicine and zootechnics. Currently, it has four experimental stations: two in Andean ecosystems (El Mantaro and Maranganí-La Raya) and two in humid tropical ecosystems (Pucallpa and Iquitos).

 Institute for Psychological Research (IIPSI): It is the unit in charge of developing research activities in relation to the area of psychology. The institute also promotes and supervises the research projects of psychology faculty and students at the university.

 Research Institute of Biological Sciences "Antonio Raimondi" (ICBAR): Founded in 1977, this unit is in charge of developing research on biodiversity and ecology, biotechnology, health and sanitation, production and management of biological resources, as well as their dissemination, preservation, use, and technology transfer within the norms that govern academic life. of the University. The institute holds the ICBAR Scientific Meeting annually since 1991, of great importance at the national level.

 Physics Research Institute: It is the center in charge of research in physics and related areas. It is also in charge of the development of colloquiums and scientific conferences focused on students and teacher-researchers.

 Research Institute of Mathematical Sciences: Founded in 1992, it is the unit responsible for research in the areas of pure mathematics, applied mathematics, statistics, scientific computing, and operations research.

 Research Unit of the Faculty of Chemistry and Chemical Engineering: It is the unit in charge of transversal research in chemistry and chemical engineering, as well as coordinating the interrelation and research of the specific institutes for each of these areas.

 Institute of Chemical Sciences: This research unit coordinates the development of research activities related to chemical science, both theoretically and experimentally. It has involved chemical studies, studies of physicochemical and phytochemical phenomena, interaction models, and synthesis of compounds, among others.

 Institute of Chemical Engineering: This institute is in charge of the development of works and investigations that involve chemical engineering. In this sense, it includes studies of environmental engineering, chemical kinetics, catalysis and biotechnology, synthesis of compounds, and study of physical-chemical phenomena, among others.

 Research Institute of Geological, Mining, Metallurgical and Geographical Engineering (IIGEO): In charge of designing research and development lines and strategies in accordance with the approach of technical and scientific projects that promote local, regional and national development. Executes projects in the following lines of research: geological engineering, mining engineering, metallurgical engineering, and geographic engineering.

 Industrial Engineering Research Institute (IIII): It is the institute responsible for research in industrial engineering. His lines of research include information technology, industrial management and production, industrial design and technology, and textile design and technology.

 Research Institute of Electrical and Electronic Engineering: It is responsible for conducting and developing all the activities inherent to the field of research in the areas of electronic and electrical engineering. Integrates, coordinates, and executes the projects of the professors and students of the faculty dedicated to research.

 Research Institute of Systems Engineering and Informatics (IIFISI): This unit has the mission of promoting the improvement of the intellectual production corresponding to the areas of systems engineering and computer science, and software engineering of the university.

 Research Institute of Administrative Sciences (IICA): It is the body in charge of research activities related to administrative sciences. Seeks to develop quality research and innovation projects at a national level.

 Research Institute of Financial and Accounting Sciences (IICFC): It is the unit responsible for research in financial and accounting sciences. It develops projects that promote professional updating and the analysis of accounting, social and business management research.

 Economic Research Institute (IIE): It is the body responsible for the production of research in economics, covering the areas of economic theory, public economics, and international economics.

 Institute of Humanistic Research (IIH): This institute's mission is to train researchers in the field of humanities: literature, art, communication and information sciences, and philosophy; as well as to promote research and the publication of the results of research carried out at the institute. It regularly holds seminars, colloquiums, debates, workshops, conferences, symposiums, congresses, round tables, and training courses for its research members.

 Institute of Applied Linguistics (CILA): It was created in 1972 as the Applied Linguistics Research Center, a name it kept until 1984. For more than 20 years it has been doing research on the linguistic and cultural diversity of Peru, which includes Andean, Amazonian, and Hispanic languages and dialects.

 Institute of Peruvian and Latin American Thought (IPPLA): It has been able to design and carry out research projects on different aspects of Peruvian thought. In principle, the institute's purpose is to carry out research on Peruvian and Latin American thought, within which it has focused fundamentally and primarily on the following areas: strictly philosophical thought, scientific-technological thought, ideological-political thought, theological-religious thought, and aesthetic-artistic-literary thought.

 Institute for Linguistic Research (INVEL): It was created as an organism of the academic department of linguistics to carry out research work in the basic areas of general (theoretical) linguistics, applied linguistics, Hispanic linguistics, and Amerindian linguistics.

 Educational Research Institute: It seeks to develop teaching strategies and methodologies that allow for maximizing the intellectual potential of the student body. Its main areas of research are educational administration and planning, teacher training, curricular design, and pedagogical evaluation.

 Law and Political Science Research Unit: Founded in 1998, it is in charge of preparing research papers on legal disciplines and political science, as well as presenting these at relevant academic events.

 Social Historical Research Institute: Founded in 1988, it is the institute responsible for the university's research and publications in the field of historical-social sciences. It also coordinates various academic activities related to social research processes.

Research groups 
In addition to the research institutes, the university has around 500 research groups grouped by academic areas and faculty, these are the research nuclei of specific topics that operate under the leadership of research professors supported by students, graduates, and associated researchers.

Production and scientific publications 
According to the annual balance prepared by the National Council of Science, Technology and Technological Innovation (CONCYTEC) of Peru in 2009, 20% of Peruvian scientific production was generated by the National University of San Marcos, which makes it the Peruvian institution with the highest scientific production in all lines of activity. In the same way, according to the Ibero-American Ranking of research institutions —prepared by SCImago research group—, the University of San Marcos is positioned in Peru as the main public university in research activity and scientific publications. Several scientific publications of the University of San Marcos and its research institutes appear in prestigious popular science magazines, such as the journals Nature and Science. Among the most relevant research topics published in the last decades, the investigations that have been carried out in the citadel of Caral, medical investigations on diabetes, and the discoveries of the fossil of the prehistoric giant cetacean stand out: Livyatan melvillei, of the prehistoric giant penguin: Inkayacu paracasensis, and the first Plesiosaur fossil located in Peruvian territory.

The following is the number of scientific publications of the University of San Marcos from 1990 to 2019 (the most recent year of data published and considered by the 2021 edition of the SCImago Institutions Rankings):

The main scientific publications of the University of San Marcos are published in academic journals Alma Máter —humanities, social sciences, and business sciences— and Theorema —basic sciences, health sciences, and engineering— and in the 20 official magazines of each of the university's faculties, which are listed below. In addition to the magazines listed below, each professional school also has its own academic journal:

Below is a brief description of the main academic publications of the faculties of the University of San Marcos, listed above: 

 Anales de la Facultad de Medicina: It is the main official publication of the "San Fernando" Faculty of Medicine for the dissemination of education, research, and issues related to medicine, medical practice, university medical teaching and the improvement of public health.

 Ciencia e Investigación: It is a publication of the Research Institute of the Faculty of Pharmacy and Biochemistry. It is responsible for publishing original and unpublished scientific articles in the field of pharmaceutical and biomedical sciences.

 Odontología Sanmarquina: It is a publication of the Research Institute of the Faculty of Pharmacy and Biochemistry. It is responsible for publishing original and unpublished scientific articles in the field of pharmaceutical and biomedical sciences.

 Revista de Investigaciones Veterinarias del Perú: The main journal of the Faculty of Veterinary Medicine disseminates original scientific articles related to the field of veterinary sciences, especially in the areas of animal production and health, public health, and veterinary education, as well as in the areas of anatomy, histology, pharmacology, physiology, nutrition, forages, and genetics. The papers deal with companion, production, wildlife and laboratory animals.

 Revista de Investigación en Psicología: It is a publication of the Psychological Research Institute of the Faculty of Psychology, dedicated to disseminating research on scientific psychology topics, in all research areas, in qualitative and quantitative modalities.

 Revista Peruana de Química e Ingeniería Química: It is a semi-annual scientific publication edited by the Research Unit of the Faculty of Chemistry and Chemical Engineering. The magazine disseminates original and unpublished scientific articles in the field of chemical sciences and chemical engineering, prepared by both national and foreign researchers.

 Revista Peruana de Biología: It is a peer-reviewed scientific publication produced by the "Antonio Raimondi" Biological Sciences Research Institute, of the University's Faculty of Biological Sciences. It is in charge of publishing complete, original, and unpublished articles on the topics of biodiversity, biotechnology, ecology, environmental management, and biomedicine.

 Revista de Investigación de Física: It is a refereed scientific publication, edited by the Faculty of Physical Sciences. It is dedicated to the publication of contribution articles in physics and physics teaching articles that result from a rigorous process of scientific initiation and research training.

 Pesquimat: It is a publication of the Research Institute of the Faculty of Mathematical Sciences. It disseminates original and unpublished articles that contribute to knowledge in the areas of pure mathematics, statistics, operations research, and scientific computing.

 Revista del Instituto de Investigación de la Facultad de Ingeniería Geológica, Minera, Metalúrgica y Geográfica: It is a publication of the Research Institute of the Faculty of Geological, Mining, Metallurgical and Geographic Engineering that is in charge of publishing original and unpublished research results in the area of earth sciences.

 Industrial Data: It is the main scientific publication, published every six months, edited by the Research Institute of the Faculty of Industrial Engineering. Original and unpublished research papers are published in the field of industrial engineering and related areas.

 Electrónica-UNMSM: It is a scientific journal published by the Research Institute of the Faculty of Electrical and Electronic Engineering. Disseminates primary and original articles on the topics of electrical engineering, electronics, telecommunications, information technology, and telematics, among others.

 Revista de Investigación de Sistemas e Informática: It is a scientific publication edited by the Research Institute of the Faculty of Systems Engineering and Informatics. Published every six months, it is dedicated to publishing original and unpublished articles on topics related to the field of systems engineering, software engineering, computer science, and informatics.

 Gestión en el Tercer Milenio: Published by the Research Unit of the Faculty of Administrative Sciences, it includes the results of research in the field of administration developed by teachers and researchers, as well as contributions from professionals from the academic and business world.

 Quipukamayoc: It is the accounting research journal edited by the Research Institute of the Faculty of Accounting Sciences, which promotes and disseminates articles on current accounting issues of a high academic level, both for the university and the business community.

 Pensamiento Crítico:It is published by the Research Institute of the Faculty of Economic Sciences, it disseminates works that address economic problems from different perspectives. The journal seeks to be a space for academic debate that covers the different fields of economics.

 Letras: It is the journal of scientific dissemination of the Faculty of Letters and Human Sciences, intended for the publication of research articles, bibliographic reviews, and opinion articles related to humanistic studies in the Peruvian and Latin American sphere.

 Escritura y Pensamiento: Magazine published by the Research Unit of the Faculty of Letters and Human Sciences, dedicated to academic and research topics in the humanities —literature, art, communication and information sciences, and philosophy—, linguistics, and on Peruvian and Latin American thought .

 Investigación Educativa: Research journals published by the Research Institute of the Faculty of Education. It disseminates the research work carried out by its member teachers in the fields of education and academia.

 Docentia et Investigatio: It is a publication of the Research Unit of the Faculty of Law and Political Science. Disseminates research work carried out by teachers and students of the faculty in an effort to contribute to the development of legal sciences and political sciences.

 Investigaciones Sociales: It is a scientific publication produced by the Social Historical Research Institute of the Faculty of Social Sciences. Its main purpose is to contribute to the efforts made by the social sciences in Peru, with a rigorous examination of the nature and content of the transformations of Peruvian and Latin American society and culture.

University Press 

The Editorial Fund of the University of San Marcos is the division in charge of publishing books, magazines, and newspapers under the seal of the university after the proposals have passed rigorous selection procedures. In order for a work to be published, it must also comply with the imposed publication regulations, as well as with the style manual that the label indicates through its website. The publications are made both in the traditional printed format and via the Internet. The publications of the editorial fund can be purchased at the bookstore and production center of the university: CENPROLID, located in the "University City".

Rankings
Together with the Cayetano Heredia University and the Pontifical Catholic University of Peru, the National University of San Marcos is one of the only three Peruvian universities, and so far the only public one, which has managed to rank first nationally in several editions of different international university rankings. In 2021, the Webometrics Ranking of World Universities of the Spanish National Research Council (CSIC) ranked the National University of San Marcos as the best university in the country, in its first ranking of the year.

In 2022, the university was awarded by the National Council of Science, Technology and Technological Innovation of Peru (Concytec) and the Elsevier corporation for being the institution with the historical highest number of scientific publications in Scopus (6,907), the largest bibliographic database of abstracts and citations of articles in all the universities of Peru.

Alliances and international exchanges

Strategic Alliance of Peruvian Universities 
In addition to the agreements of the university itself described above, it has counted as a main member of the Strategic Alliance of Peruvian Universities with agreements to achieve exchanges of undergraduate and postgraduate students from the three main Peruvian universities —UNMSM, UNI and UNALM— and others public and private Peruvian universities as associated members. These exchange programs have occurred mainly with universities in Germany, France, Spain, and Italy,  and Japan, as well as other Latin American, European, North American, and Asian countries.

Culture and heritage

Cultural centers 
Currently, the National University of San Marcos has two important cultural centers in two of its historic buildings. The well-known Casona de San Marcos —its main cultural center— and the Colegio Real de San Marcos.

Casona of the National University of San Marcos 

The Cultural Center "La Casona" of San Marcos (acronym: CCSM), is the main historical venue of the university. Founded as the headquarters of the Jesuit novitiate of San Antonio Abad, it became the headquarters of the university in 1861, remaining as such until the middle of the 20th century, when the university moved to its current campus in Ciudad Universitaria. After its recent restoration, the "Casona" is the main reference point for the cultural and artistic activity of the University, and one of the best-preserved buildings from the colonial era in the city of Lima. It is one of the main tourist attractions of the Historic Center of Lima. The complex is part of the area and the list of buildings in the historic center of the capital that in 1988 was declared a World Heritage Site by UNESCO.

The history of the Casona goes back to the year 1605 when Antonio Correa Ureña gave the Jesuits an important donation for the construction of their novitiate or probation house. In the early years, the complex consisted only of a chapel and two courtyards. After its destruction by the 1746 earthquake, it was rebuilt by the Jesuits following the same layout as before. It would remain like this until 1767 when the Jesuit order was expelled from the Viceroyalty of Peru, and it became the location of the Real Convictorio de San Carlos. In 1821, after the independence of Peru was proclaimed, the Casona complex became the main premises of the University of San Marcos, then reaching its maximum splendor. The general hall of the Casona had historical importance as the location of the first Constituent Congress of Peru at the time of independence, in addition to witnessing the events of the War of the Pacific with the Chilean invasion in Lima and the destruction and appropriation of several of its collections.

Since the transfer of the university, the Casona remained a place of great historical value and importance not only for the university but for the city, which is why in 1989 the National University of San Marcos, the Spanish Agency for International Cooperation (AECI) and the National Institute of Culture sign a Peru-Spain agreement to achieve the restoration of the architectural complex and adapting it to new use as a space dedicated to culture, research, and artistic creation. Currently, the Casona, as the Cultural Center of San Marcos, offers cultural extension courses, and exhibitions, and is the headquarters of several university museums and research centers. Inside the Casona, the Salón de Grados stands out —formerly the Chapel of Loreto—, where the official ceremonies of the honorary doctorates awarded by the university are held.

Royal College of the University of San Marcos 

The "Royal College" Cultural Center of Contemporary Peruvian Cultures, established as such in 2006, is the second cultural center of the University of San Marcos and also one of the historic buildings of Lima as it is located in the environment of the old "Royal College" of San Marcos dating from the colonial period, next to the Congress of the Republic of Peru. It is made up of three units of the university: the Institute of Applied Linguistics CILA, the "Domingo Angulo" Historical Archive of the University of San Marcos, and the Andean Rural History Seminar. Exhibitions and shows are regularly held, which mainly take place in the exhibition hall of the Royal College.

The history of the Royal College dates back to the end of the 16th century, when it was founded on the initiative of Viceroy Francisco Álvarez de Toledo in 1592. It was a school that studied canons and laws, for the education of the children, grandchildren, and descendants of the conquerors, Spaniards, and residents of the kingdom, as well as people of recognized merit. The rector of the college was also the rector of the University of San Marcos; the day-to-day administration of the school fell to the vice-rector, who lived in the cloister. Both positions had a duration of two years and were maintained even in the event that the rector ceased to be the rector of the University. The rectoral biennium ran from June 28, the eve of the feast of Saint Peter and Saint Paul. The constitutions and ceremonies of the Colegio Mayor Santa Cruz were kept in the College. After the Bourbon reforms that led to the expulsion of the Jesuits, the campus was recast as the Convictorio de San Carlos. At the end of the 18th century, the War Inspector Gabriel de Avilés y del Fierro dedicated the premises to the headquarters of the Royal Regiment of Lima. Later, during the Republican era, it was the headquarters of the General Staff of the Army. Since the end of the 20th century, the University of San Marcos has given the Royal College the functions of a Cultural Center and Historical Archive.

Higher education and research centers 
The University of San Marcos has the following higher education and research centers, two of which also function as house museums and have their respective specialized libraries:

 Raúl Porras Barrenechea Institute: Center for Advanced Studies and Peruvian Research (acronym: IRPB) was created in homage to the illustrious teacher from San Marcos, Raúl Porras Barrenechea. The institute is in charge of: the Raúl Porras Barrenechea House-Museum —part of the “Mario Vargas Llosa” Literary Route—, declared a historical and artistic monument, for which reason all its works of art, and furniture are permanently preserved, guarded, and exhibited, paintings, sculptures, photographs, family and personal memories; the Porras file; and the museum of Peruvian writers. It is located in the Miraflores district and is a neighbor of the Ricardo Palma House-Museum, which allows it to fully develop the purposes for which it was founded and which has made it one of the poles of cultural activity in the country. His main research spans the areas of humanities, arts, and social sciences.

 Temple Radicati Library-Museum Foundation: Center for Advanced Studies and Peruvian Research (acronym: FBMTR) It was created in homage to the distinguished San Marcos residents Ella Dunbar Temple Aguilar de Radicati and Carlo Radicati di Primeglio, who donated their property and all their cultural assets to the university, including an invaluable collection of 26 quipus. The foundation is in charge of the Temple Radicati House-Museum, as well of its specialized library. Its functions include promoting studies and research of legal, historical, anthropological, archaeological, sociological, ecological, and geographical nature, as well as carrying out various cultural activities.

 Center for Asian Studies (acronym: CEAS) is an organization focused on the study and research of Asian countries, such as China, Taiwan, Japan, Korea, Indonesia, India, Thailand, among others, in matters of economy, politics, culture, art, society, history, and international relations. It was founded on November 7, 2018 in the Casona de San Marcos within the framework of the Second Annual Meeting of the Fudan University Consortium - Latin America (FLAUC), an event co-organized by Fudan University and the National University of San Marcos. The main objectives of CEAS are: the development and promotion of knowledge about the countries of Asia, the generation of related research, and the proposal of adequate policies for a better use of the opportunities offered by this region, in matters of development, investment, trade and tourism.

University museums 
In addition to the two centers for higher studies and research that also function as house museums, the University of San Marcos currently has five institutions that function exclusively as museums, these are:

 Museum of Natural History of Lima: The Natural History Museum, founded on February 28, 1918, was located until 1934 in the Casona de San Marcos; It is currently located outside the university campus, in the Jesús María district. The museum is an important information center on Peruvian biodiversity, thus serving students and national scientists in a documented way. Studies carried out by museum researchers include ecological studies, inventories of the country's biodiversity, and monitoring of natural communities. The museum's collections include specimens of flora, fauna, and geology, many of which also have historical value, as they are specimens obtained by important naturalists such as Antonio Raimondi, Augusto Weberbauer, Ramón Ferreyra, Emma Cerrate, Wolfgang Karl Weyrauch, Hans Koepcke and María Koepcke, among others. Currently, the collections exceed a million and a half copies, many of which are exhibited to the public in an open and permanent manner or in temporary exhibitions.
 Sacaco Paleontological Museum: It is a paleontological museum located in the Bella Unión district, one of the thirteen districts of the Caravelí province, located in the department of Arequipa. It is part of the set of museums of the National University of San Marcos attached to the Faculty of Biological Sciences and a subsidiary of the Museum of Natural History of Lima. The museum protects the Sacaco Paleontological Zone, recognized by the Ministry of Culture of Peru as a Cultural Heritage of the Nation, this being one of the Paleontological Sites of the Pisco and Camaná Basins that together form part of the indicative list of possible nominees as Heritage of Humanity in Peru.

 Museum of Art: Founded in 1970 by the art historian Francisco Stastny, under the name of Museum of Art and History, it is located in the right-hand courtyard of the Casona de San Marcos. It is currently made up of four collections: the “Popular Art” collection, made up of ceramics and fabrics from towns in the mountains and jungle, which reflect ancient traditions in their elaboration; the collection of "Portraits" that represent teachers from San Marcos and authorities from the 16th, 17th and 18th centuries; that of "Modern and Contemporary Art", made up of paintings and sculptures that won competitions organized by the university between 1950 and 1970; and the archive collection of “Peasant Painting”. In addition to the exhibitions, the museum publishes various publications, and promotes workshops for university students and the general public.

 Museum of Archeology and Anthropology: Founded in 1919 by the Peruvian archaeologist Julio C. Tello, under the name of Museum of Archeology and Ethnology, it is located between the Patio de Letras and the Patio de los Jazmines de la Casona de San Marcos. The museum has received throughout its history the support of renowned researchers such as Julio César Tello, Luis Eduardo Valcárcel, Luis Lumbreras, Ruth Shady, among others. In 1946, a considerable set of historical objects was transferred to the National Museum of Archaeology, Anthropology, and History of Peru, however, the museum's collection continues to encompass a wide diversity of cultural objects: lithics, ceramics, textiles, metals, and organic material. The participation of the museum and the archeology area of the university in various archaeological projects is very relevant, such as studies on Chavín, Paracas, and the Casma valley; the recovery and study of the constructions of Caral, the first American civilization; and the research work carried out in many archaeological sites and huacas in the country. The museum also carries out various courses and workshops; as well as publications, exhibitions and conferences where they present the results of recent archaeological and anthropological studies.

 Historical Museum of Physical Sciences: It was created on November 11, 1986, with the aim of exhibiting the pieces that were part of the physics cabinet that was previously located in the Casona of the University of San Marcos. The current Historical Museum of Physical Sciences is made up of four areas: the optics and modern physics area, the solid and fluid mechanics area, the heat and waves area, and the electricity and magnetism area. The current purpose of the museum is to promote this discipline, as well as to publicize instruments that long ago allowed experiments to be carried out in this area of research. The museum is located in the pavilion of the Faculty of Physical Sciences of the university, in the University City.

 Museum of the History of Peruvian Medicine: It is the institution in charge of preserving the medical, historical, bibliographic and documentary heritage of the origins of modern medicine in Peru and the Faculty of Medicine of the National University of San Marcos. Among the objects and documents that it preserves, the following stand out: historical medical instruments; the minutes of the Faculty councils and graduation records; the Hipólito Unanue file; the Daniel Alcides Carrión archive made up of his family letters and publications on the wart; watercolors and manuscripts by Antonio Raimondi; paintings of outstanding alumni; old volumes of centenary journals: The Lancet, JAMA, among others; collection of bachelor's theses and medical doctor's theses from 1856 to 1978; works from the 16th century by classical authors; film material, and others.

 Museum of Paleontology: It is the institution in charge of preserving and exhibiting the collection of the Faculty of Geological, Mining, Metallurgical, and Geographical Engineering of the National University of San Marcos. It is made up of paleontology, petrology, and mineralogy cabinets.

 Museum of Minerals: It is the institution in charge of preserving and exhibiting the collection of the Faculty of Geological, Mining, Metallurgical and Geographic Engineering of the National University of San Marcos and part of the private collection of Guido del Castillo, mining engineer, and Peruvian cultural manager. It was inaugurated in September 2019, within the framework of the 35th anniversary of the Professional School of Geological Engineering. It has an important collection of fluorescent minerals, the second of its kind in Peru.

Archaeological sites 
The National University of San Marcos has under its custody various archaeological sites, remains, pieces, and historical collections, highlighting the following:

 Huaca de San Marcos and others of the Maranga archaeological complex: These archaeological sites are located within the main university campus. They are part of the Maranga monumental complex, belonging to the Lima culture, which extends between the district of Lima, the San Miguel district and the Pueblo Libre district, having preserved archaeological remains of this complex in other places such as within the Parque de las Legends and inside the Pontifical Catholic University of Peru. The main building is located at one end of the campus and has the name "Huaca de San Marcos" or "Huaca San Marcos". It is studied and guarded by archaeologists and researchers from the University of San Marcos, in it, various ceramics have been found, as well as offerings such as spondylus and quipus. Being a site of great cultural importance, the Ministry of Culture of Peru first declared the Huaca San Marcos and then all the minor archaeological sites on the campus, as Cultural Heritage of the Nation.

 Pacopampa Archaeological Site: This ceremonial complex is located in the department of Cajamarca, Chota province, Querocoto district. In 1966, Pablo Macera organized a trip to the archaeological site, previously identified by Rafael Larco Hoyle, and in 1970 he got Emilio Choy Ma, a researcher of Ancient Peru, to make a donation to San Marcos to acquire the Pacopampa Ceremonial Center. Since that date, the university has had permanent care of the archaeological monument. Different archaeologists have come to carry out 16 archaeological campaigns. In the first stage, the archaeologists Hermilio Rosas and Ruth Shady intervened. Later, different investigations have been carried out by the archaeologist Rosa Fung Pineda, Peter Kaulicke, Isabel Flores, Idilio Santillana, Daniel Morales Chocano, and Jaime Miasta Gutiérrez. In 2009, an archaeological mission from Japan led by Yuji Seki identified the grave goods of a woman called the "Lady of Pacopampa", which would be almost 3,000 years old. On November 21, 2010, the Ministry of Culture of Peru declared the Archaeological Site of San Pedro de Pacopampa as Cultural Heritage of the Nation.

 Sacaco Paleontological Zone: Millions of years ago, the current Sacaco desert was a bay with enormous beings due to its dimensions, a marine area that, as a result of geological changes, has preserved the fossils of various species that lived during the upper Miocene and lower Pliocene; among these stand out huge sharks, whales, giant oysters and megatheriums that are now exposed. In this context, Hans Jacob Siber founded the Sacaco Paleontological Museum to preserve the paleontological zone of the same name, which was recognized by the Ministry of Culture of Peru as Cultural Heritage of the Nation. This area is part of the Paleontological Sites of the Pisco and Camaná Basins that together are currently on the indicative list of possible nominees as World Heritage Sites in Peru.

Specialized libraries 
The University of San Marcos, in addition to its central Library and the libraries of its faculties located mainly in the University City, has four other important specialized libraries:

 Spain Library of the Arts: Previously known as the "Spanish Library of the Cultural Center of the National University of San Marcos", it is dedicated to collecting, organizing, preserving, and disseminating the bibliographic and audiovisual heritage, facilitating access to specialized cultural information, as well as supporting research in its areas. themes.
 Library «Raúl Porras Barrenechea Institute»: It contains the personal papers of the San Marcos educator Raúl Porras Barrenechea, his research files, letters, ballot papers, notebooks, notebooks and notes, publications, and original texts of his written production, a documentary set that constitutes the Porras Archive. The Melitón Porras Archive and part of the José Gálvez Archive, handed over by his heirs, are also preserved in this location.
 Museum of Natural History Library: The "Javier Prado" Museum of Natural History has collections of enormous historical value in its library, which are the product of important naturalists such as Antonio Raimondi, Augusto Weberbauer, María Koepcke, among others. These collections make the library and the museum important information centers on Peruvian biodiversity — flora, fauna, and geology.
 Temple-Radicati Library: It is part of the “Temple-Radicati” Library-Museum Foundation, which was established in 1996 thanks to donations from Ella Dunbar Temple Aguilar de Radicati and Carlo Radicati di Primeglio. The collection is made up of Spanish and Italian encyclopedias, dictionaries, books on history, geography, sociology, literature and various novels, law, art, archaeology, etc.

Collections and manuscripts 

Through its "Domingo Angulo" Historical Archive, the National University of San Marcos preserves copies of documents and writings of great historical relevance dating from the 16th, 17th, 18th, and 19th centuries, such as the Royal Provision and the Royal Decree of Emperor Carlos I of Spain and V of the Holy Roman Germanic Empire of May 12, 1551, and the papal bull Exponi Nobis of Pius V of July 25, 1571, with which the constitution of the University of San Marcos as the first university in the American continent. In 2019, the “Colonial Fund and Founding Documents of the National University of San Marcos: 1551 -1852” was incorporated into the UNESCO Memory of the World Register, in recognition of its significance for global collective memory.

Various institutions of the University of San Marcos such as the Central Library, the Museum of Natural History, the Archeology and Anthropology Museum, and the Raúl Porras Barrenechea Institute, among others, also have what were private collections and manuscripts of illustrious San Marcos people who left as a legacy to his university; works by authors and researchers such as César Vallejo, José María Arguedas, Raúl Porras Barrenechea, Ella Dunbar Temple, Julio César Tello, Antonio Raimondi, etc. These manuscripts and collections are kept by the University of San Marcos and entrusted to the corresponding university dependency according to their historical and scientific context.

Other centers, schools, and cultural offices 
The University of San Marcos has agencies and departments that promote cultural activities, below is a description of some of them:

 University Ballet: The San Marcos Ballet (BSM) has been in existence for more than forty years. Its main headquarters for the ballet school and its presentations are the premises of the Cultural Center of San Marcos. In recent years, the San Marcos ballet has been under the direction of Vera Stastny, in such a way that the collaborations of choreographers such as the Costa Rican Rogelio López and the British Royston Maldoom have been fostered.

 University Band: The San Marcos Band and Orchestra Direction is an artistic, cultural, and protocol unit of the University of San Marcos. It is currently a dependency of the Cultural Center of San Marcos. It has its origin in 1996 when the university authorities conceived the idea of providing San Marcos with a Music Band. The group, made up of San Marcos people interested in the field, participates in the protocol acts of the university and invitations to which they were summoned.

 Language Center: The UNMSM Language center is the institution in charge of providing courses in: English, French, Portuguese, German, Italian, Quechua, Korean and Spanish for foreigners. It has a laboratory equipped with video and individual audio booths. It offers the courses at different times, daily, every other day, and only on weekends. The language center of the University of San Marcos offers its courses to the university community and the general public, it works mainly at the premises of the Faculty of Letters and Human Sciences, within the University City, in Lima district and Its stores are located in the Los Olivos district and in the San Juan de Lurigancho district.

 Film and Television: The current San Marcos Film and Television Direction has its main antecedent in the "Cine Arte de San Marcos", an organization that held its first session in 1967 at the Casona del Parque Universitario, currently the headquarters of the Cultural Center of San Marcos. Since then, film projections, conferences, exhibitions, and seminars have been held regularly. In April 1998, the Cine Arte de San Marcos was incorporated into the San Marcos Cultural Center and began the publication of its cinematographic culture magazine: "BUTACA sanmarquina". Since 2006, workshops taught by filmmakers such as Giovanna Pollarolo, Josué Méndez, and Armando Robles Godoy have been implemented. Since that same year, Mario Pozzi-Escot has been in charge of the Film and Television program, as it is currently called, at the university.

 San Marcos University Choir: The Choir of the University of San Marcos (CUSM) was founded in November 1954 at the request of several students from San Marcos. Its first director was the musicologist, arranger, and composer Rosa Alarco Larrabure, who dedicated a large part of her life to the investigation of traditional Peruvian music. The CUSM has offered innumerable presentations in various places in Peru and has participated in national and international festivals. Currently, the CUSM is made up of students from different faculties, workers, teachers, and graduates of the University of San Marcos.

 University Theater of San Marcos: The Theater of the University of San Marcos (TUSM) was founded on September 4, 1946, in Lima, at the request of several students from the Faculty of Letters, with Manuel Beltroy as director and only professor at that time; this being the first initiative in Peru for a university theater program. Over the years, TUSM has participated in numerous festivals and international meetings in Latin America, Denmark, and Monaco, among other countries. It is currently under the direction of Mario Delgado Vásquez.

 Tuna of San Marcos: The tuna university was created by the initiative of some young students in 1996. In recent years the Tuna of the University of San Marcos has participated in various contests and meetings in the region, competing with national and foreign universities and obtaining first places. La Tuna de San Marcos has held recitals, festivals, meetings, and contests with the aim of disseminating the art of good tuna music, such as those held in the main auditoriums of the University of San Marcos, the ICPNA, the Parque de la Exposición, among others. .

 Female Tuna of San Marcos: Better known as la tuniña, it was founded in 1999 at the initiative of the university students themselves. This is the only cast from the university that has represented it in Europe (Portugal and Spain), obtaining various awards and recognitions in contests and meetings. Likewise, he has participated in cultural activities in Chile, Ecuador, and Bolivia, having also covered almost all of his country's soil. La Tuniña organizes, every two years, the Tunas Peru International Biennial, which brings together the best tunas for a week, thanks to the support of the university and public and private institutions and international organizations.

Heritage 
The Casona of the National University of San Marcos —historical location of the university with more than 400 years of history—, the Royal College of the National University of San Marcos and the Basilica and Convent of Santo Domingo, are monuments that are part of the area and the list of buildings in the Historic Center of Lima recognized as World Heritage by UNESCO since 1988.

The National University of San Marcos also has —or is historically related to— several monuments considered by the Ministry of Culture of Peru as Cultural Heritage of the Nation, as they are architectural works or places of artistic, historical, cultural, and social value.

Athletics

The University of San Marcos has been very important in university sports activity in Peru. On August 7, 1924, San Marcos students founded the University Sports Federation of Peru (FEDUP). Since 1936, this federation has organized the National University Sports Games, the Regional University Sports Games and the National University Championships. In addition, since 1963 it has participated in the Universiade.

Most university sports activities take place in the Gymnasium and in the San Marcos University Stadium. Sports and disciplines include: soccer, futsal, volleyball, rugby, shooting, table tennis, basketball, athletics, long-distance running (middle-distance running and long-distance running), handball, Olympic swimming, synchronized swimming, water polo, Greco-Roman wrestling, karate, judo, kung fu, wushu, taekwondo, aikido, capoeira, Wing Chun, taichi, Xing Yi Quan, pa kua chang, Chi Kung, powerlifting, weightlifting, aerobics, rhythmic gymnastics, fencing, among others. Parallel to this, the university has a lot of teams that participate in the national and regional leagues of different sports.In this field, the basketball team of the University of San Marcos stands out, which participates in the Lima Basketball League, both in the men's division and in the women's superior division. 

In the case of soccer, which is the most popular sport in Peru, it has always had special significance for San Marcos students. Throughout its history, the University of San Marcos has had various professional football teams, including the University Football Federation (Club Universitario de Deportes), founded in 1924 by students of the association of the representative teams of the Faculties of the then Royal and Pontifical University of San Marcos and the Special Schools of Engineering, Agronomy and Central Normal until was separated from the university and became private due to problems with the authorities in 1932; and the Deportivo Universidad San Marcos that came to dispute the second division until 2012.

National University Games: Universiade 
The first university Games were held in 1936, in the city of Lima. Among others, the following participated: the La Molina National Agrarian University, the National University of Engineering, the National University of Saint Augustine of Arequipa, the National University of San Antonio Abad of Cuzco and the of the National University of San Marcos, which was the first university to host the event. Since then, the distance of four years between each Games was marked —recently they have been taking place every 2 years—, having a special edition to commemorate the four hundredth anniversary of the founding of the of the National University of San Marcos in 1951. That year, as part of the of the urban development of Lima and of incentive to the university sport, the Stadium of the University of San Marcos was inaugurated in the center of the main campus.

The University of San Marcos has teams for the different sports disciplines with which it has been national champion in most editions of what are now called Universiade: National university games —San Marcos has won 9 of the 11 editions where a champion was declared—, thus being the most successful university in these national games.

2019 Pan American Games 

Likewise, for the celebration of the 2019 Pan American Games, the Organizing Committee of Lima 2019 chose various sports facilities located between the city of Lima, as well as in Callao, as Pan American venues. Among them, the National University of San Marcos, which had its stadium remodeled to host the event.

2019 South American U-17 Championship 

The Stadium of the National University of San Marcos was the sole venue of the 2019 South American U-17 Championship that took place in Peru. The tournament champion was Argentina, which achieved its fourth title in this category. Peru was in fifth place.

Football 
Football, the most popular sport in Peru, has always had special significance for San Marcos students. Throughout its history, the University of San Marcos has had various professional soccer teams, among them the Federación Universitaria de Fútbol (today the Club Universitario de Deportes) and the Club Deportivo Universidad Nacional Mayor de San Marcos.

Origin of the Club Universitario de Deportes 

José Rubio Galindo, a student at the Faculty of Letters, and Luis Málaga Arenas, a student at the Faculty of Medicine, dedicated their free hours to exchanging ideas with a view to realizing a common desire: "to form a great institution." Then they would join Plácido Galindo, Eduardo Astengo, Rafael Quirós, Mario de las Casas, Alberto Denegri, Luis de Souza Ferreira (who scored the first Peruvian goal in a FIFA World Cup), Andrés Rotta, Carlos Galindo, Francisco Sabroso, Jorge Góngora, Pablo Pacheco, Carlos Lassus and Carlos Cillóniz among others.

Thus, on August 7, 1924, at 7:00 p.m. (UTC-5), university students met at the headquarters of the Federation of Students of Peru, at 106, Juan de la Coba street, in the city of Lima, giving rise to the Federación Universitaria de Fútbol as an association of the representative teams of the Faculties of the University of San Marcos and the Special Schools of Engineering, Agronomy and Central Normal.

In the founding act of the club, it was determined to establish as a shield a garnet-colored letter "U" enclosed in a circle of the same color with a white background. The design was in charge of Luis Málaga Arenas from Arequipa, at that time a delegate of the "San Fernando" Faculty of Medicine and one of the most enthusiastic managers of the formation of the Federación Universitaria de Fútbol. The first shields were large and had a very rustic finish. They were used on the left side of the chest and in some cases in the center of the uniform. Currently, the official design of the shield uses more stylized typography and the background of the shield is cream. In sportswear, it is always used on the left side.

The National Sports Committee, the highest body of Peruvian sports at that time, recognized the Federación Universitaria as if it were a League. Hence, together with the Peruvian Football League, the Amateur Association, the Callao League, Circolo Sportivo Italiano and Lima Cricket and Football Club, they formed the Football Federation. After participating in different inter-university tournaments and friendly matches between 1924 and 1927, the Peruvian Football Federation invited the Federación Universitaria to participate in the Selection and Competition Championship (First Division Tournament) of 1928.

It made its official debut on May 27 against the José Olaya de Chorrillos Club, whom it beat 7:1.At the end of the championship, the Federación Universitaria ranked second behind Alianza Lima, with which they played for the title in three games: (1:0 victory, 1:1 draw and 2:0 defeat). In 1929, the championship only had the participation of twelve teams due to the suspension of Alianza Lima for refusing to cede its players to the national team. In this tournament, Federación Universitaria obtained its first national title, at the end of the championship with seven wins, three draws and one loss, completing seventeen points, one more than Circolo Sportivo Italiano, which it had defeated 7:0. Carlos Cillóniz, a Federación Universitaria footballer, scored eight goals, becoming the top scorer in the championship.

In 1930, the first FIFA World Cup was held in Montevideo, Uruguay, and the Peruvian team attended the event with a squad that featured eight players from the Federación Universitaria squad (Eduardo Astengo, Carlos Cillóniz, Luis de Souza Ferreira, Alberto Denegri, Arturo Fernández, Plácido Galindo, Jorge Góngora and Pablo Pacheco). After the World Cup, the club's first official tour took place: it traveled to the provinces by steamboat to face the Association White Star, which it defeated 1:0, then he toured Huacho and participated in the Gubbins Cup. That same year, it was part of group 2 in the national tournament, achieving two victories and a draw, with which he advanced to the final league, where it placed third.

The following year, discrepancies arose internally with the authorities of the National University of San Marcos, since the rector José Antonio Encinas prohibited the use of the name —Federación Universitaria de Fútbol— and this led to the change, by Club Universitario de Deportes, becoming independent. totally from university. The club, which is currently the team with the most national titles in the history of Peruvian football, maintains an important historical link with the University of San Marcos.

Club Deportivo San Marcos 

In 2001, the University of San Marcos created the Club Deportivo Universidad Nacional Mayor de San Marcos, which was born as a club in the summer of 2001. In subsequent years it would rise in the district and regional leagues until it reached the Second Division of Peru, where it played until 2011. Club San Marcos played at home in the San Marcos stadium located on the university campus. The team baptized with the name "The lions", because this animal is the symbol of Mark the evangelist, had its best participation in 2006, when it reached the runner-up position in the Second Division.

Later, the university creates Deportivo San Marcos. The club participates from 2013 to date in the first division of Cercado de Lima. It is one of the main cheerleading teams in the tournament and was runner-up three times. He qualified several times for the Interleague tournament in Lima. Then the San Marcos Cultural Sports Association, which participated in the Pueblo Libre district league in 2013 and qualified for the Lima Interleagues of the same period. Finally, the university has its own football team that participates in the University Football League organized by FEDUP, from 2008 to the present.

Notable alumni and academics 

Both formally and colloquially the characters that have been part of the National University of San Marcos; students, professors, researchers, and even those who have been awarded the distinction of honorary professor or the title of Doctor honoris causa, have received the title of sanmarquinos. The word has been in common use by the Peruvian population throughout its history to refer to the close and prominent figures of this house of studies, and even to the pets and animals adopted by the university community.

Alumni, faculty, and researchers 
In its more than 470 years of history, the National University of San Marcos has seen numerous students, professors, researchers, deans, and rectors who have stood out at the local, national, Latin American, and global levels. The University of San Marcos has had a very significant influence on the development of science, medicine, engineering, law, politics, social, humanities, arts and sports subjects, throughout the history of Peru, managing to highlight the students and professors in decisive times for the national reality such as: throughout the Viceroyalty —16th, 17th and 17th centuries —; during the process of Independence —18th and 19th centuries —; and in the current republican era —19th, 20th and 21st centuries. Among the most outstanding people from San Marcos we can mention scientists and engineers such as Pedro Peralta y Barnuevo, Santiago Antúnez de Mayolo —candidate for the 1943 Nobel Prize in Physics—, Federico Villarreal, Alfred Rosenblatt, Eduardo de Habich, Carlos Bustamante Monteverde and Harald Helfgott; doctors like Hipólito Unanue, Cayetano Heredia, Daniel Alcides Carrión and Alberto Barton; writers and artists such as Mario Vargas Llosa — 2010 Nobel Prize in Literature , the only Peruvian Nobel to date—, César Vallejo, Alfredo Bryce Echenique, José María Arguedas —candidate for the 1971 Nobel Prize in Literature—, Ricardo Palma, Abraham Valdelomar, Javier Heraud, Blanca Varela, Ventura García Calderón —candidate for the 1934 Nobel Prize in Literature — and Alberto Hidalgo —candidate for the 1966 Nobel Prize in Literature—; social researchers such as Julio César Tello, María Rostworowski, Ruth Shady, José de la Riva Agüero y Osma, Javier Prado y Ugarteche, Raúl Porras Barrenechea and Jorge Basadre; lawyers and politicians such as Francisco García-Calderón Landa —candidate for the 1934 Nobel Prize in Literature—, Mariano H. Cornejo Zenteno —candidate for the Nobel Peace Prize from 1931 to 1939—, José Bernardo de Tagle, Bernardo O'Higgins, Víctor Raúl Haya de la Torre, Víctor Andrés Belaúnde and Beatriz Merino; economists like Javier Silva Ruete and Daniel Schydlowsky Rosenberg; twenty-one Presidents of the Republic of Peru; among many others.

Honoris causa doctorates 
The Honoris causa doctorate is the highest academic distinction conferred by this higher house of studies. The University of San Marcos began to award this recognition in the 19th century to the two greatest liberators of South America: José de San Martín and Simón Bolívar. In addition to these, among the main figures who have received this recognition from the university during the 20th and 21st centuries are Pope John Paul II, French President Charles de Gaulle, Argentine writer Jorge Luis Borges, researchers Alberto Barton and Maria Reiche, the Secretary-generals of the United Nations Javier Pérez de Cuéllar and Ban Ki-moon, and the Nobel Prize laureates: Albert Einstein, Peter Agre, Peter C. Doherty, Pablo Neruda, Camilo José Cela, Mario Vargas Llosa, Muhammad Yunus, Adolfo Pérez Esquivel, Peter Diamond, Robert C. Merton, Eric Maskin, Cristóbal Pissarides, among others

Popular culture 

 Ricardo Palma recounts in one of the stories of his Peruvian Traditions, entitled El Patronato de San Marcos, how the institution acquired its current name in the 16th century and Mark the Evangelist as its patron —as well as, by extension, the Lion of Saint Mark as his pet.

 In 1572, Francisco de la Cruz, sixth rector of the University of San Marcos, was accused of being alumbrado and was therefore imprisoned by the Inquisition. A case was opened accusing him of being a false prophet, aberrational conduct in an exorcism, aberrational ideas such as the restitution of land to indigenous peoples, and heresy. The process came to an end in 1576, and although torture was applied to force him to retract, he was finally found guilty for having been and is a pertinacious heretic, heresiarch, dogmatizer, and teacher of new sects and errors. He was burned at the stake during an auto da fe on April 1, 1578. Another alumnus involved in an auto-da-fé was the doctor Francisco Maldonado da Silva, burned at the stake on January 23, 1639.

 In 1811, the School of Medicine of the University of San Marcos began its operations in the Hospital Real de San Andrés, a place that the university had already begun to use since 1792 when it inaugurated its first anatomical amphitheater there. This campus, which was part of the university, has great historical value to this day. On the one hand, because it is the oldest hospital in Peru and South America, and on the other, since it is the last place that —according to Inca Garcilaso de la Vega and José de Acosta— would have housed a group of mummies of Inca royalty, among these those of the emperor Pachacuti. Currently, archaeologists from San Marcos are involved in a project to enhance the local area as a cultural center and medicine museum.

 Harvard University, founded in 1636, is the oldest university in America (United States). In turn, the University of San Marcos, founded in the City of the Kings in 1551, is in a way its "counterpart" and "sister", being the oldest university in the Americas and thus, in Latin America. This historical peculiarity has contributed to the recent significant increase in cooperation between the two institutions in terms of student exchange, promotion of studies, teacher training, and support for researchers. Before the COVID-19 pandemic, there was a program "Sanmarquinos for the Peru and the World" where more than 20 teachers and 140 students (the first two places in each professional school at the end of General Studies (sixth cycle) and student leaders) from the National University of San Marcos traveled to receive training through 15 days at Harvard University. After the expiration of the alliance with Laspau, after the COVID-19 pandemic, the program seeks agreements with other universities in the world, for example in 2022, the students had an internship at UNAM.
 In 1937 the "Clock Tower" of the University of Puerto Rico in Río Piedras was erected; it includes the shields of the University of San Marcos on the left, the shield of the University of Puerto Rico in the center, and the shield of Harvard University on the right. San Marcos established in Lima, Peru in 1551 is the oldest University in the Americas. Harvard, founded in Cambridge, Massachusetts in 1636, is the oldest university in the United States. Both represent the oldest universities in South America and North America, from which the University of Puerto Rico aspires to inherit its centuries-old educational traditions. 
 The Coordinator of Inter-American Affairs, a United States agency, recorded a documentary on Lima in 1944 that included a visit to the University of San Marcos, then located in the Casona. In the recording you can see the old admission process consisting of an oral exam; One of the teachers and evaluators registered in the documentary is the historian and diplomat from San Marcos Raúl Porras Barrenechea. 
 During World War II, the Peruvian and San Marcos doctor Ernesto Pinto-Bazurco living in Germany came to suffer persecution by the Gestapo, eventually being imprisoned in the Laufen castle in 1942. Years later, when he was released, he assumed the position of Consul of Peru in Germany, which allowed him to issue documentation and passports that helped several Jews to escape the Holocaust promoted by the Nazi regime. In 1948 he returns to Peru, where he resumes his medical profession. He passed away on May 19, 2014. Laufen Castle, where he was imprisoned, now has a memorial plaque in his honor. 
 The short novel The lurker at the threshold, started by the American horror and science fiction writer H. P. Lovecraft and finished in 1945 by August Derleth —a writer belonging to the Circle of Lovecraft— mentions the University of San Marcos as one of the locations where fragments of the mythical Necronomicon, a fictional magical book from the Lovecraftian universe, are kept. The other locations for fragments of the grimoire are the British Museum, the National Library of France, Harvard University, the University of Buenos Aires and the non-existent Miskatonic University. 
 The novel Conversation in the Cathedral (1969) by the Peruvian writer Mario Vargas Llosa, has Santiago Zavala as its protagonist, who narrates various events of his life through the novel, one of which is his time at the University of San Marcos during the government of Manuel Odría.
 Luis Abanto Morales, Peruvian singer and composer of folk songs, composed a marinera titled San Marcos, in honor of the four-hundred-year-old university.
 In the novel The Storyteller (1987), by the writer Mario Vargas Llosa, both the first narrator and Saúl Zuratas, a character who develops a deep appreciation and connection with the Machiguenga ethnic group, are former students of the University of San Marcos.
 On November 28, 1987, chapter 56 of the anime , premieres. aid episode was titled:  and in it, the Virgo gold knight Shaka makes use of a special technique to send his fighting adversary, the bronze knight Phoenix, through the six worlds of metempsychosis —"wheel of reincarnations"—, one of these being hell. In this scene, one of the main background images used by the animators to represent hell is a photo of former United States President Richard Nixon being booed and insulted by students from San Marcos during his visit to the Mansion of the National University of San Marcos in 1958.
 The American television series MacGyver stages the University of San Marcos in the episode The Treasure of Manco (1990). In that episode MacGyver, the protagonist, travels to Peru and visits San Marcos to meet with María, the daughter of a renowned archaeologist from San Marcos, with whom he inquiries about a supposed Inca treasure hidden in the Andes.
 In the autobiographical book A Fish in the Water (1993), Mario Vargas Llosa, 2010 Nobel Prize in Literature, recounts several significant episodes in his life, including his time as a law and literature student at the University of San Marcos.
 In the 1991 version of the 20 nuevos soles bill —currently still in circulation together with the 2011 version— there is the image of the San Marcos professor and diplomat Raúl Porras Barrenechea. To the side, one can see the main patio of the Casona of the National University of San Marcos, where he taught. In the 2011 version, the image of Raúl Porras Barrenechea continued.

 In 1994 Dark Horse Comics published a series of 4 comics called Indiana Jones and the Arms of Gold, part of the famous American series and franchise. In the story, the young Indiana Jones travels to Peru and meets Dr. Julio Huertas, a renowned former professor at the National University of San Marcos, fired for being an APRA activist and exiled in Buenos Aires, Argentina. Doctor Huertas helps Indiana Jones in his search for "The Golden Finger" —an artifact that according to said fiction formed "The arms of Chimu Taya of Cuzco", part of the golden armor of the great Inca emperor Pachacuti.

 The Peruvian television series Hombres de bronce, hosted by Alejandro Guerrero and produced by Panamericana Televisión in the late 1990s, aired several episodes dedicated to San Marcos intellectuals of the early and mid-20th century, such as: César Vallejo, Julio César Tello, Augusto Weberbauer, Daniel Alcides Carrión, José María Arguedas, Santiago Antúnez de Mayolo, among others. In these episodes, various patios of the Casona of the National University of San Marcos were used in the representations of the aforementioned characters from their university days.
 The Peruvian Image and Sound Archive (ARCHI) recovered in 2011 a color recording of May 12, 1951, Alfred William Gauger record of the symbolic laying of the first stone of what would be the "University City" of San Marcos, all this as part of the celebrations of the 400th anniversary of the founding of the university that took place in 1951.
 The university is also recognized for the activism and active participation of its students in politics, literature, science, and technology; despite the time they have known how to accommodate what they propose and historically have had several achievements that marked the history of the country, even from the time of the viceroyalty, independence, and in the 20th and 21st centuries.
 The University of San Marcos has several traditions and characters typical of the contemporary university culture of Peru. Among the best-known traditions are the pre-university times, the verbenas (artistic parties) of each faculty, as well as the presentations of the sikuris, the tuna, and the artistic, academic and sportive activities on the anniversary of each faculty or school; while among the best-known characters is the diner called the "Gusano Legendario" (the one who becomes the first to receive his ration during the Christmas and Independence Day meals), the late pet named "Perrovaca" dog who surrounded around the central dining room until 2019, the mascots of the faculties, and the internal mobility service where each bus is referred to as the "Burro".
 The University of San Marcos is considered the most representative university in the country and is usually referred to as the reflection of Peru. A nationwide survey carried out by the newspaper El Comercio and Ipsos on the occasion of the celebrations of July 28 in 2013 showed that when identifying Peru with a university: 41% do so with the University of San Marcos, the second and third place are the identifications with the National University of Engineering (14%) and the Catholic University (7%).
 On May 12, 2017, within the framework of the celebrations for its 466th anniversary, the National University of San Marcos became an ambassador and licensee of the Peru Brand upon receiving from PromPerú the license to use the aforementioned country brand. This is in view of the historical and academic significance of the university for the country and the Americas.
 In the 2019 movie Dora and the Lost City, a live action version of the Dora the Explorer series broadcast by Nickelodeon, one of its protagonists: Alejandro Gutiérrez, a character played by the Mexican actor and comedian Eugenio Derbez, presents himself as an explorer and professor at the National University of San Marcos. In the film, Dora and Professor Gutiérrez embark on an adventure to locate a great lost treasure of the Incas in the highlands of Peru. Additionally, Isabela Moner, a Peruvian-American actress who played Dora, stated that she learned a little Quechua for the film from audio recordings by a professor at the University of San Marcos in Peru.

Gallery

See also

 Education in Peru
 List of universities in Peru
 List of colonial universities in Latin America
 Casona de la Universidad Nacional Mayor de San Marcos
 University City of the National University of San Marcos
 National School of Sciences and Arts of Cuzco, considered the oldest school in Peru

Notes

References

External links

 National University of San Marcos website
 Faculty of Medicine website

 
San Marcos, Major National University of
San Marcos, Major National University of
Neoclassical architecture in Peru
Spanish Colonial architecture in Peru
National universities